= List of schools in Bracknell Forest =

This is a list of schools in Bracknell Forest, in the English county of Berkshire.

== State-funded schools ==
=== Primary schools ===
- Ascot Heath Primary School, Ascot
- Binfield CE Primary School, Binfield
- Birch Hill Primary School, Bracknell
- College Town Primary School, College Town
- Cranbourne Primary School, Cranbourne
- Crown Wood Primary School, Crown Wood
- Crowthorne CE Primary School, Crowthorne
- Fox Hill Primary School, Bracknell
- Great Hollands Primary School, Great Hollands
- Harmans Water Primary School, Harmans Water
- Holly Spring Primary School, Bracknell
- Jennett’s Park CE Primary School, Bracknell
- King's Academy Binfield
- King's Academy Oakwood, Binfield
- Meadow Vale Primary School, Bracknell
- New Scotland Hill Primary School, Sandhurst
- Owlsmoor Primary School, Owlsmoor
- The Pines Primary School, Hanworth
- St Joseph's RC Primary School, Bracknell
- St Margaret Clitherow RC Primary School, Hanworth
- St Michael's CE Primary School, Sandhurst
- St Michael's Easthampstead CE Primary School, Easthampstead
- Sandy Lane Primary School, Bracknell
- Uplands Primary School, Sandhurst
- Warfield CE Primary School, Warfield
- Whitegrove Primary School, Warfield
- Wildmoor Heath School, Crowthorne
- Wildridings Primary School, Bracknell
- Winkfield St Mary's CE Primary School, Bracknell
- Wooden Hill Primary School, Bracknell

=== Secondary schools ===
- The Brakenhale School, Bracknell
- Edgbarrow School, Crowthorne
- Garth Hill College, Bracknell
- King's Academy Binfield
- King's Academy Easthampstead Park, Bracknell
- Ranelagh School, Bracknell
- Sandhurst School, Owlsmoor

=== Special and alternative schools ===
- College Hall, Bracknell
- Kennel Lane School, Bracknell

=== Further education ===
- Bracknell and Wokingham College, closed in 2019.

== Independent schools ==
=== Primary and preparatory schools ===
- Eagle House School, Sandhurst
- Lambrook, Bracknell
- Newbold School, Binfield

=== Senior and all-through schools ===
- Heathfield School, Ascot
- Licensed Victuallers' School, Ascot
- Wellington College, Crowthorne

=== Special and alternative schools ===
- Cressex Lodge School, Binfield
