= Edgbarrow =

Edgbarrow may refer to:

- Edgbarrow School, a secondary comprehensive school in Crowthorne, Berkshire, England
- Edgbarrow Woods, woods situated between Sandhurst and Crowthorne, Berkshire, England
