= Southern England =

Sub-national area of England

Southern England South of England or The South
- The four Southern England statistical regions combined shown within England. Other definitions of the South vary and have changed over time.
- Sovereign state: United Kingdom
- Country: England
- Major cities: London; Bristol; Brighton and Hove; Plymouth; Milton Keynes; Southampton; Portsmouth
- Boroughs

Area
  - Total: 23,955 sq mi (62,042 km^{2})

Population (mid-2024 estimate)
  - Total: 31,198,679
  - Density: 1,302.4/sq mi (502.86/km^{2})
  - Urban: 22,806,000
  - Rural: 5,139,000
- Demonym: Southerner
- Time zone: UTC+0 (GMT)
  - Summer (DST): UTC+1 (BST)

Southern England, also known as the South of England or the South, is the southern part of England, covering the statistical regions of London, the South East, the South West, and the East. It is bordered by the Midlands to the north, and shares a border with Wales to its far north-west. Altogether, it forms a population of nearly 28 million and an area of 23,955 square miles (62,042 km^{2}). The most populous city in Southern England is London, then Bristol. Greater London is its most populous county, followed by Hampshire, Kent, and Essex.

Southern England has cultural, economic and political differences from the Midlands and Northern England. The United Kingdom, including England, has higher regional inequality than average among OECD countries, with Southern England more economically prosperous than Northern England, the Midlands, Scotland, Wales, and Northern Ireland.

== Definitions ==
For official purposes, the UK government does not refer to Southern England as a single entity, but the Office for National Statistics divides UK into twelve regions. In England, the North West, North East and Yorkshire and the Humber make up the North ("centre-north"); the West Midlands and East Midlands (as well as Wales) make up the Midlands ("centre-south") and the rest of England make up the South.

Culturally speaking, the majority of people think that the South consists of the South East (92%), Greater London (88%), South West (87%), and to lesser extent the East of England (57%). However, 35% of people surveyed placed the East of England as part of the Midlands. Generally people in the North tend to put the East of England in the South more than people in the South or Midlands.

The Home Counties identify in a similar way to the neighbouring Midlands, in this case sharing culture with London and the outer areas yet identifying as separate from each.

== Geography ==
The South contains approximately a quarter of the United Kingdom's area. The geographic split is north-east (fenlands), south (downlands and a coastal plain) and west (following the River Thames to the Bristol channel and a peninsula).

The South has land borders with Wales and the English Midlands and a sea border with France, Belgium and the Netherlands.

The South is generally more low-lying than the North. There are a number of hill ranges, such as the Cotswolds and the Chilterns. The highest point in the South is High Willhays 2,037 ft (621 m), located in Devon within Dartmoor National Park.

=== Largest cities and settlements ===
London is the largest city in the South of England and is the capital of the United Kingdom. The London Metropolitan Area has a population of 14.2 million (2019), making it the largest metropolitan area in Europe.

Largest cities and towns in Southern England 2021 Census
Rank		Counties	Pop.	Rank		Counties	Pop.
1	London	Greater London	8,776,535	11	Bournemouth	Dorset	196,455
2	Bristol	Bristol	425,215	12	Peterborough	Cambridgeshire	190,605
3	Brighton and Hove	East Sussex	277,105	13	Swindon	Wiltshire	183,680
4	Plymouth	Devon	266,955	14	Southend-on-Sea	Essex	182,305
5	Southampton	Hampshire	249,620	15	Oxford	Oxfordshire	170,805
6	Milton Keynes	Buckinghamshire	264,340	16	Slough	Berkshire	160,270
7	Luton	Bedfordshire	233,525	17	Cambridge	Cambridgeshire	152,740
8	Portsmouth	Hampshire	223,305	18	Ipswich	Suffolk	151,565
9	Reading	Berkshire	203,795	19	Poole	Dorset	141,005
10	Norwich	Norfolk	200,770	20	Watford	Hertfordshire	131,325

The table below shows the urban areas in the region with a population of at least 250,000.

Largest urban areas in the South, South West, and East Anglia (2011 census)
Rank	Area	Population	Area (km^{2})	Density (People/km^{2})	Primary settlements (Note: ONS definition.)
1	Greater London	9,787,426	1,737.9	5,630	London boroughs and City of London, Watford, Hemel Hempstead, Harlow, Bracknell, Guildford, Woking, St Albans
2	South Hampshire	855,569	192.0	4,455	Southampton, Portsmouth, Eastleigh, Gosport, Horndean, Havant, Locks Heath, Fareham, Waterlooville
3	Bristol	617,280	144.4	4,274	Bristol, Filton, Kingswood
4	Brighton and Hove	474,485	89.4	5,304	Brighton, Hove, Worthing, Littlehampton, Shoreham
5	Bournemouth/Poole	466,266	131.0	3,559	Bournemouth, Poole, Christchurch
6	Reading	318,014	83.7	3,800	Reading, Wokingham, Woodley
7	Southend-on-Sea	295,310	71.8	4,111	Southend-on-Sea, Rayleigh
8	Plymouth	260,203	59.7	4,356	Plymouth
9	Luton	258,018	50.7	5,088	Luton, Dunstable
10	Farnborough/Aldershot	252,397	78.5	3,217	Farnborough, Aldershot, Camberley, Farnham

== Demographics ==
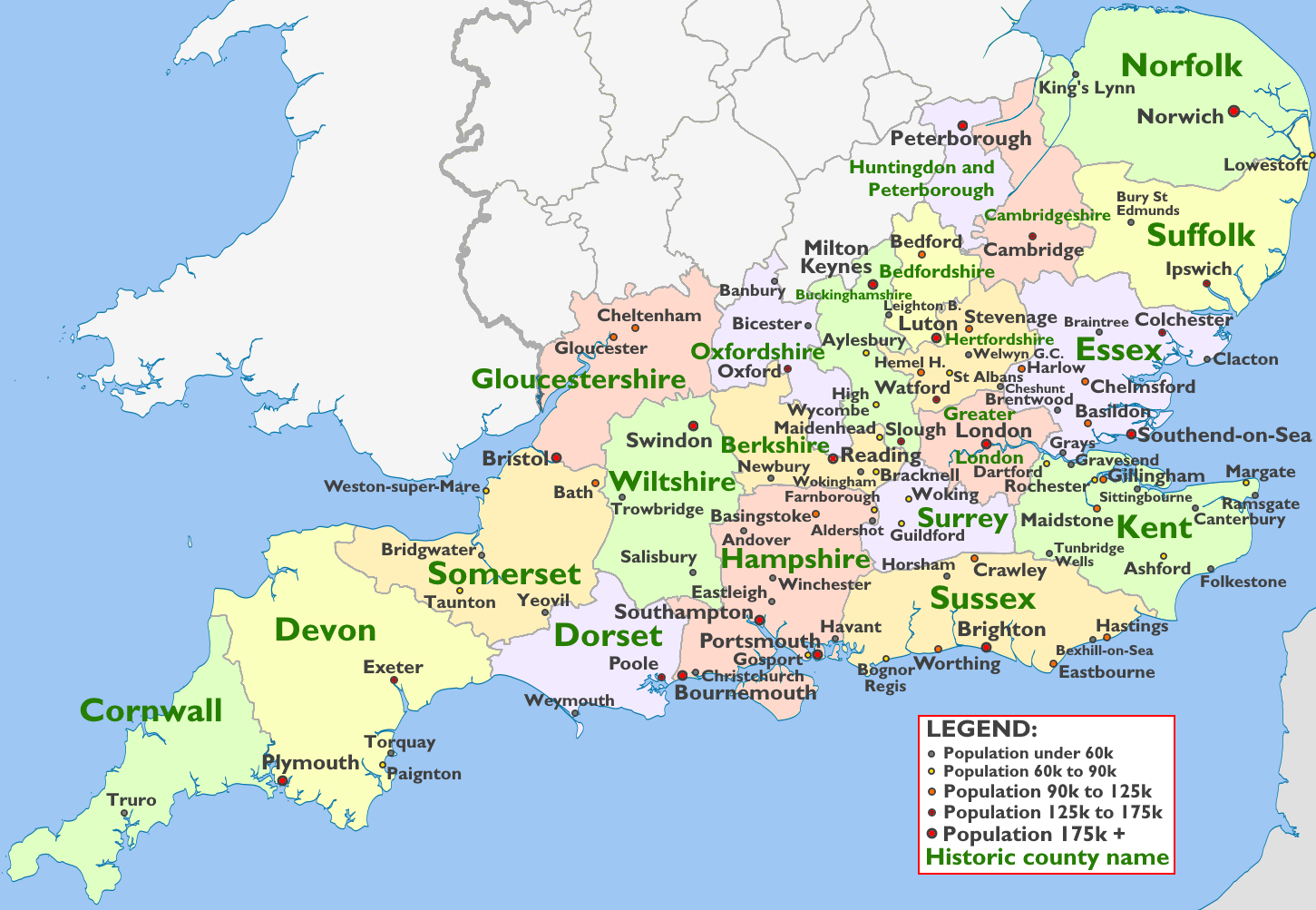
Map of southern England showing cities and other population centres alongside the historic counties (with the exception of Greater London)

=== Wealth and class ===
Broadly speaking, Southern England is considerably wealthier than the Midlands and the North. The South East England region was found to have the highest concentration of high-wealth families in the country, followed by London. Studies have shown that the areas making up Surrey and Sussex are the wealthiest in Britain based on the value of assets owned by the average resident. Many of the home counties in particular have been considered to be "posh", including Surrey, Oxfordshire and Hertfordshire, based on factors such as number of golf clubs, independent schools, and noted "beautiful" countryside villages. Additionally, the single wealthiest district in Britain, based on residents's income, is London's Royal Borough of Kensington and Chelsea. As many as eight of the top ten are districts of London, with the remaining two being Borough of Guildford and Borough of Elmbridge, both within the London commuter belt. The "least deprived" neighbourhood in England has been found to be near Amersham in the county of Buckinghamshire, in the South of England.

However, despite overall higher wealth in the regions of Southern England, there also exist highly impoverished areas here. Cornwall, in the South West, is one of the poorest counties in England based on income. The town of Jaywick, in Essex, was found to be England's single most deprived neighbourhood. Many London boroughs were also found to be highly deprived, including Kensington and Chelsea where significant wealth inequality exists. Numerous other districts in the South also ranked among the country's most deprived in these statistics including Swale, Thanet, Hastings and Great Yarmouth.

=== Language ===
==== English ====
English is the native language of the English people and the main language spoken in the South. The South of England has a dialect and accent distinct from that of other parts of the UK. Due to the prominence of the South in media and politics, Standard British English is largely based on the English spoken in the South. For example, the standard British accent, Received Pronunciation, is very similar to the educated speech of London, Oxford and Cambridge.

Standard Southern British English, a "modern" form of Received Pronunciation, is now considered to be the most commonly spoken form of English in much of the South. Estuary English has grown to become one of the most spoken dialects in London and counties including Kent and Essex. London's expansion has also affected language and dialect in surrounding areas of Southern England, such as the north-east fenlands in East Anglia; the traditional Cockney dialect's population of London's East End has moved out to the north and east Home Counties with a knock on effect to East Anglia's population, which itself has had its own long time dialect, East Anglian English.

In the South West of England, West Country English is a common regional dialect and is the only rhotic dialect spoken in Southern England.

==== Cornish ====
Cornish is a revived language spoken in Cornwall and is an important part of the identity and culture of the Cornish people.

=== People ===
People often apply the terms "southern" and "south" loosely, without deeper consideration of the geographical identities of Southern England. This can cause confusion over the depth of affiliation between its areas. As in much of the rest of England, people tend to have a deeper affiliation to their county or city. Thus, residents of Essex are unlikely to feel much affinity with people in Oxfordshire. Similarly, there is a strong distinction between natives of the south-west and south-east. The broadcaster Stuart Maconie has noted that culturally "there's a bottom half of England [...] but there isn't a south in the same way that there's a north".

=== Health ===
Life expectancy at birth for boys in 2012-2014 by local authority district in England and Wales. Lighter colours indicate longer life expectancy.

One major manifestation of the North–South divide is in health and life expectancy statistics. All three Northern England statistical regions have lower than average life expectancies and higher than average rates of cancer, circulatory disease and respiratory disease. The South of England has a higher life expectancy than the North, however, regional differences do seem to be slowly narrowing: between 1991–1993 and 2012–2014, life expectancy in the North East increased by 6.0 years and in the North West by 5.8 years, the fastest increase in any region outside London, and the gap between life expectancy in the North East and South East is now 2.5 years, down from 2.9 in 1993. Furthermore, all such figures represent an average – affluent northern towns such as Harrogate have higher life expectancies than less affluent areas of the South such as Southampton or Plymouth.

== Education ==
The South of England has a number of world-renowned universities, such as the ancient universities of Oxford and Cambridge, and many Russell Group universities, such as Imperial College London, University of Exeter and the London School of Economics.

== Sport ==
=== Football ===
The South Coast Derby is used to describe football matches played mainly between Portsmouth Football Club and Southampton Football Club. However, in Portsmouth's absence from top flight football, AFC Bournemouth and Brighton and Hove Albion – based about 30 miles (48 km) and 60 miles (97 km) from Southampton respectively – gained promotion to the Premier League, with some media outlets marketing fixtures against them as a South Coast derby.

Other major derbies in Southern England are West Country derbies and London derbies.

=== Rugby ===
Rugby union is the dominant code played in the south with a minor rugby league presence. (Note: The sport of rugby experienced a schism in 1895 with many teams based in Yorkshire, Lancashire and surrounding areas breaking from the Rugby Football Union and forming their own rugby code. The disagreement was over the professional payments and "broken time" or injury payments.) One of the biggest derbies is the West Country derby (Bath v Gloucester).

== Divisions ==
=== Regions and ceremonial counties ===
Southern England consists of four regions and 22 counties: the East of England, London, South East and South West. Ceremonial counties are:

South West:

- Bristol
- Cornwall
- Devon
- Dorset
- Gloucestershire
- Somerset
- Wiltshire

South East:

- Berkshire
- Buckinghamshire
- West Sussex
- East Sussex
- Kent
- Oxfordshire
- Hampshire
- Isle of Wight
- Surrey

London:

- City of London
- Greater London

East:

- Bedfordshire
- Cambridgeshire
- Hertfordshire
- Essex
- Norfolk
- Suffolk

=== Historic counties ===
The historic counties ceased to be used for any administrative purpose in 1899 but remain important to some people, notably for county cricket.

- Bedfordshire
- Berkshire
- Buckinghamshire
- Cambridgeshire
- Cornwall
- Devon
- Dorset
- Essex
- Gloucestershire
- Hampshire
- Hertfordshire
- Huntingdonshire
- Kent
- Middlesex
- Norfolk
- Oxfordshire
- Somerset
- Suffolk
- Surrey
- Sussex

=== Devolution ===
There is a network of local enterprise partnerships, some areas are further devolved:

- Buckinghamshire
- Cambridgeshire and Peterborough (combined authority)
- Cornwall and Isles of Scilly
- Dorset
- London (enterprise panel)
- New Anglia
- Oxfordshire
- Swindon and Wiltshire
- West of England (combined authority)
- Greater Brighton City Region (economic board)

Catalyst South (strategic alliance):

- Coast to Capital
- Enterprise M3
- Hertfordshire
- South East
- Solent
- Thames Valley Berkshire
- GFirst
- Heart of the South West

=== Other ===
- Home Counties (areas adjoining Greater London)
- East Anglia (former kingdom)
- Thames Valley (upper valley)
- Wessex (former kingdom)
- West Country (demonym of area with a specific dialect)

== See also ==
- Constitutional status of Cornwall
- European Parliament constituencies in the United Kingdom
- Home Counties
- North–South divide in England
- North–South divide in the United Kingdom
- Regions of England
- Subdivisions of England
- Lloegyr
