= Little Sandhurst =

Coordinates: 51.354°N 0.808°W

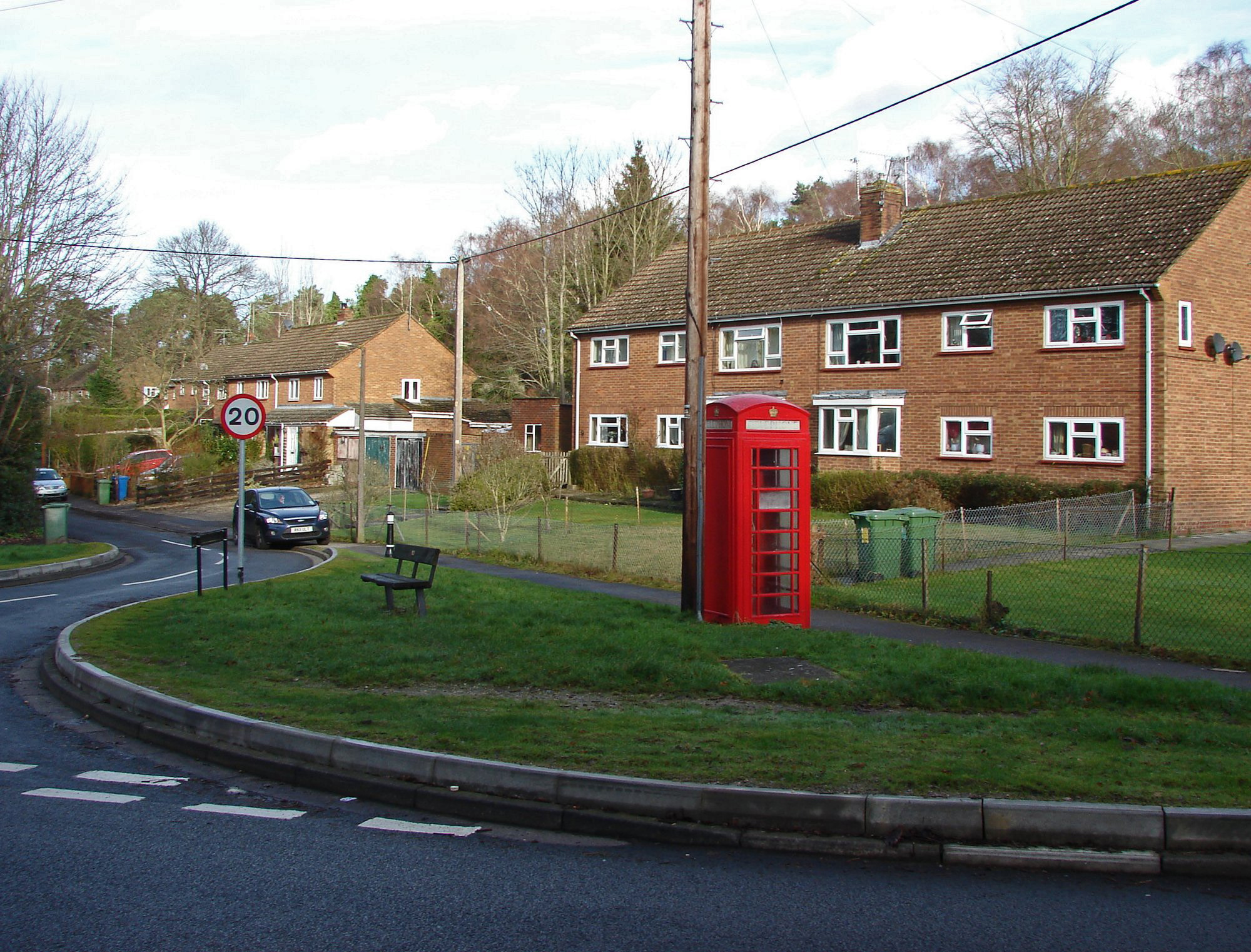
- Edgbarrow Rise, a street in Little Sandhurst

- Location within Berkshire
- OS grid reference: SU830622
- Metropolitan borough: Bracknell Forest
- Metropolitan county: Berkshire
- Region: South East
- Country: England
- Sovereign state: United Kingdom
- Post town: SANDHURST
- Postcode district: GU47
- Dialling code: 01252, 01344
- Police: Thames Valley
- Fire: Royal Berkshire
- Ambulance: South Central
- UK Parliament: Bracknell

Little Sandhurst is a suburb of Sandhurst in Berkshire, England, and part of the civil parish of Sandhurst.

The settlement lies near to the A321 road, and is located approximately 0.75 miles (1.21 km) northwest of Sandhurst town centre.

== Geography ==
Little Sandhurst has a Site of Special Scientific Interest just to the east of the suburb, called Sandhurst to Owlsmoor Bogs and Heaths, which includes a nature reserve called Wildmoor Heath.

The suburb also is next to two more local nature reserves one called Ambarrow Court and the other Edgbarrow Woods, which is on the grounds of Wellington College.

== Public houses ==
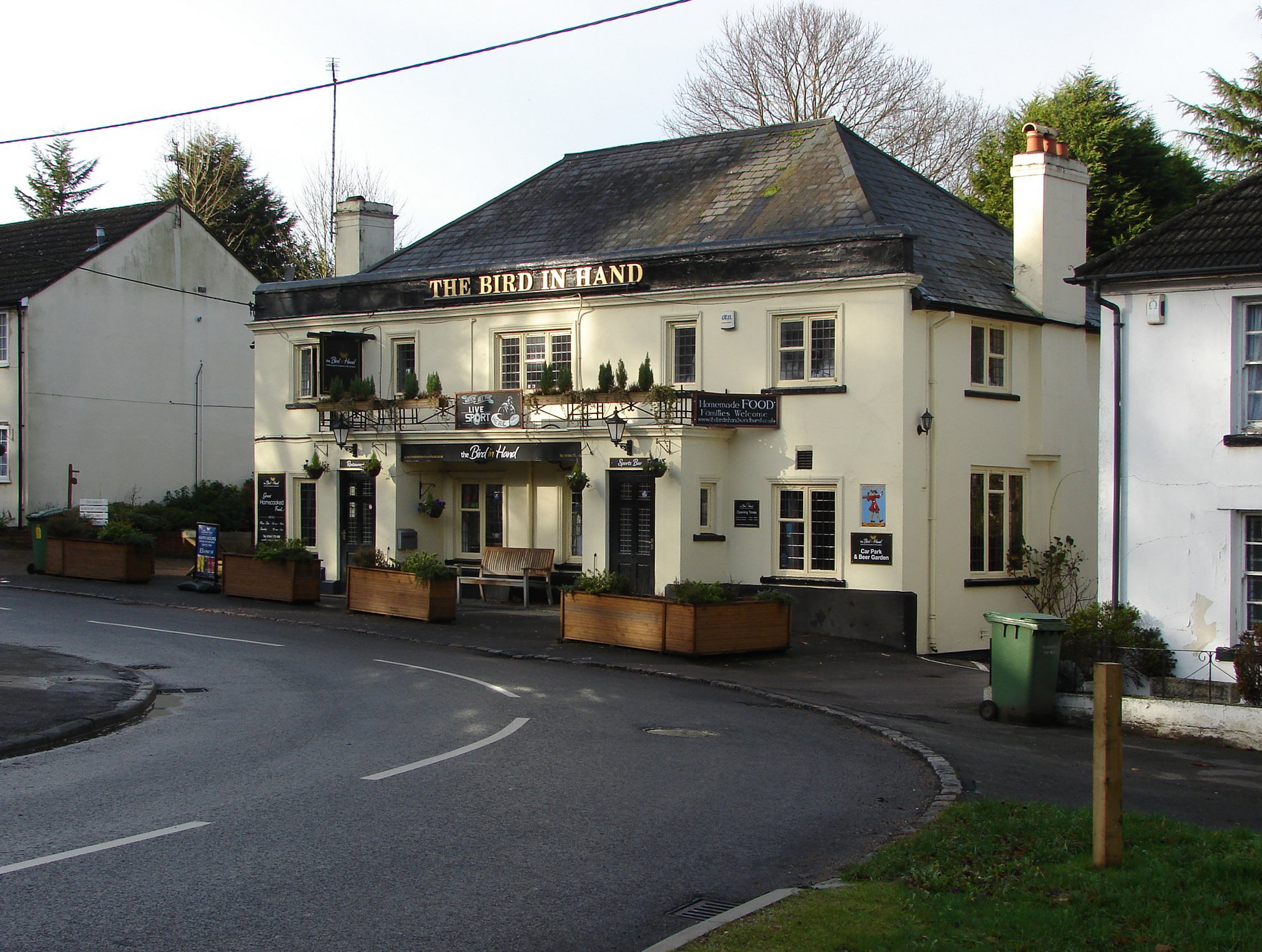
The Bird in Hand, Little Sandhurst

- The Bird in Hand

== Schools ==
- New Scotland Hill School
