= Birch Hill =

Coordinates: 51.390518°N 0.751527°W

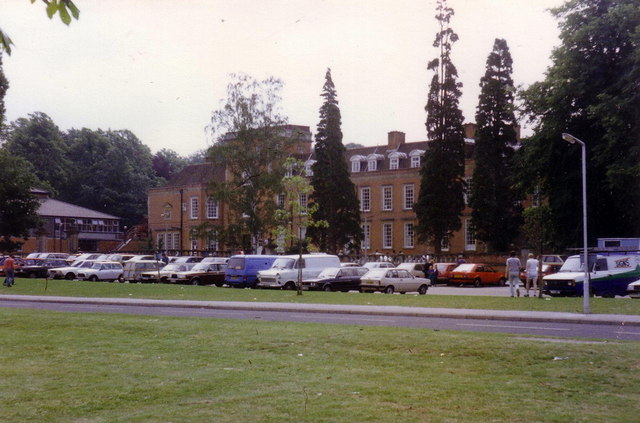
- South Hill Park Arts Centre

- Location within Berkshire
- OS grid reference: SU869664
- Metropolitan borough: Bracknell Forest
- Metropolitan county: Berkshire
- Region: South East
- Country: England
- Sovereign state: United Kingdom
- Post town: BRACKNELL
- Postcode district: RG12
- Dialling code: 01344
- Police: Thames Valley
- Fire: Royal Berkshire
- Ambulance: South Central
- UK Parliament: Bracknell

Birch Hill is a southern suburb of Bracknell, originally part of the now-defunct civil parish of Easthampstead, in the English county of Berkshire. Although Birch Hill is a separate ward in Bracknell Town Council it is combined with Hanworth to form Hanworth ward in Bracknell Forest Council. The Birch Hill estate was built in the 1970s on the slightly higher ground above South Hill Park, a Georgian and Victorian country house in parkland with two lakes (known locally as North Lake and South Lake), now an arts centre. Birch Hill is bounded by Hanworth to the west, Crown Wood and Forest Park to the north-east, Easthampstead to the north and Nine Mile Ride and the Crown plantations of Swinley Forest to the south.

Facilities include Birch Hill Primary School, a large Sainsbury's supermarket near the A322, a shopping centre that also serves Hanworth, a library, community centre and the Silver Birch public house. Coral Reef Water Park and the Look Out Discovery Centre are nearby. The streets in Birch Hill are named in alphabetic order. For example, the southernmost area includes from east to west Naseby, Northcott, Nutley, Oakengates, Octavia, Orion, Qualitas and Quintilis.
