= List of schools in Berkshire =

There is no county-wide local education authority in Berkshire, instead education services are provided by the six smaller unitary authorities of Bracknell Forest, Reading, Slough, West Berkshire, Windsor and Maidenhead and Wokingham:

- List of schools in Bracknell Forest
- List of schools in Reading, Berkshire
- List of schools in Slough
- List of schools in West Berkshire
- List of schools in Windsor and Maidenhead
- List of schools in Wokingham
