= Owlsmoor =

Suburb of Sandhurst, Berkshire, England

Coordinates: 51.357612°N 0.784785°W

Little Owlsmoor
- Location within Berkshire
- OS grid reference: SU849624
- Civil parish: Sandhurst
- Unitary authority: Bracknell Forest
- Ceremonial county: Berkshire
- Region: South East
- Country: England
- Sovereign state: United Kingdom
- Post town: SANDHURST
- Postcode district: GU47
- Dialling code: 01344 and 01276
- Police: Thames Valley
- Fire: Royal Berkshire
- Ambulance: South Central
- UK Parliament: Bracknell

Owlsmoor is a suburb of Sandhurst in Berkshire, England, and part of the civil parish of Sandhurst.

The settlement lies near to the A3095 road, and is located approximately 1 mile (1.6 km) north-east of Sandhurst town centre.

== Geography ==
Owlsmoor has a Site of Special Scientific Interest just to the west of the suburb, called Sandhurst to Owlsmoor Bogs and Heaths, which includes a nature reserve called Wildmoor Heath

== Schools ==
- Sandhurst School
- Owlsmoor Primary School
