= Crown Wood =

Coordinates: 51.399515°N 0.738546°W

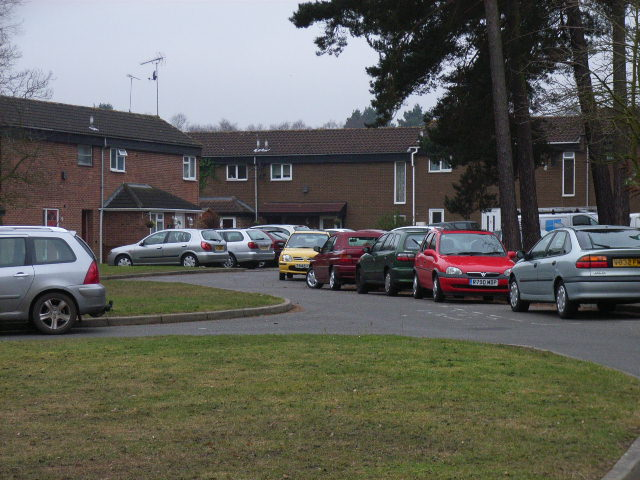
- Keeper's Combe

- Location within Berkshire
- OS grid reference: SU878674
- Metropolitan borough: Bracknell Forest
- Metropolitan county: Berkshire
- Region: South East
- Country: England
- Sovereign state: United Kingdom
- Post town: BRACKNELL
- Postcode district: RG12
- Dialling code: 01344
- Police: Thames Valley
- Fire: Royal Berkshire
- Ambulance: South Central
- UK Parliament: Bracknell

Crown Wood is a south-eastern estate of Bracknell in the English county of Berkshire, and formerly part of the parish of Winkfield.

Crown Wood was built during the late 1970s and is bounded in by Forest Park to the east, Harmans Water to the north and Birch Hill to the west and is east of the A322 Bagshot Road. It, together with Harmans Water, forms the Harmans Water & Crown Wood ward, and is named after the Crown Estate of Swinley Forest.

Facilities include a shopping centre, The Crown Wood public house, a community centre doctors' surgery and Crown Wood Primary School .
