= Hanworth, Bracknell =

Suburb of Bracknell, Berkshire, England

Coordinates: 51.392514°N 0.762526°W

Hanworth
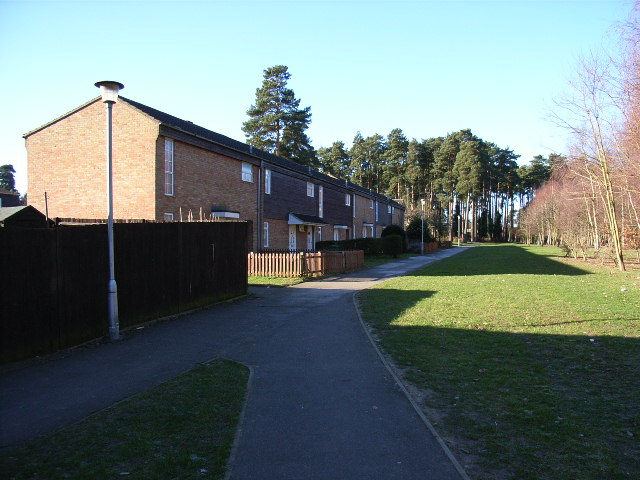

- Location within Berkshire
- OS grid reference: SU861666
- Metropolitan borough: Bracknell Forest
- Metropolitan county: Berkshire
- Region: South East
- Country: England
- Sovereign state: United Kingdom
- Post town: BRACKNELL
- Postcode district: RG12
- Dialling code: 01344
- Police: Thames Valley
- Fire: Royal Berkshire
- Ambulance: South Central
- UK Parliament: Bracknell

Hanworth is a southern suburb of Bracknell, originally part of the now-defunct civil parish of Easthampstead, in the English county of Berkshire. The Hanworth estate was built in the 1970s upon the site of the wooded Hanworth Plantation. It is bounded by Birch Hill to the east, Great Hollands to the north-west, Easthampstead and the Church Hill estate to the north and the Nine Mile Ride and Crown plantations at Crowthorne Woods to the south. The Iron Age hill fort of Caesar's Camp is basically at Hanworth, although it has been transferred to the parish of Crowthorne.

Although Hanworth is a separate ward in Bracknell Town Council it is combined with Birch Hill to form Hanworth ward in Bracknell Forest Council. The south west part of Hanworth, roads Oakengates, Ollerton, Orion, Octavia, Qualitas and Quintilis, is called Roman Hill after nearby Caesar's Camp. There are two schools in Hanworth, The Pines Primary and St. Margaret Clitherow Primary (Catholic). The Pines site also houses Hanworth Community Centre and The Church @ The Pines, a Methodist/Church of England ecumenical church. Opposite the road is the Cannie Man public house. Shops are in Birch Hill.
