= Farnborough/Aldershot built-up area =

Conurbation in England

Coordinates: 51.24°N 0.75°W

Farnborough/Aldershot built-up area and Aldershot Urban Area are names used by the Office for National Statistics (ONS) to refer to a conurbation spanning the borders of Surrey, Berkshire and Hampshire in England, and covering an area of 81.9 km^{2}. The ONS found a population of 266,358 in 2021 (up 4.66% from the 2011 figure of 254,499 residents).

A conurbation consisting of Aldershot and Farnborough, together with Frimley and Camberley was identified as a conurbation since at least the mid 20th century. These four places had a total population of 70,000 in 1931 which grew to 91,700 by 1961.

Most of the conurbation lies alongside the River Blackwater which gives a wider area including Fleet (which is not geographically in the Blackwater Valley) the alternate name of Blackwater Valley.

The area forms part of the London metropolitan area and borders the Metropolitan green belt. It almost adjoins the somewhat lower density Reading/Wokingham Urban Area at Sandhurst.

== Subdivisions ==
It was given these subdivisions in the 2011 census:

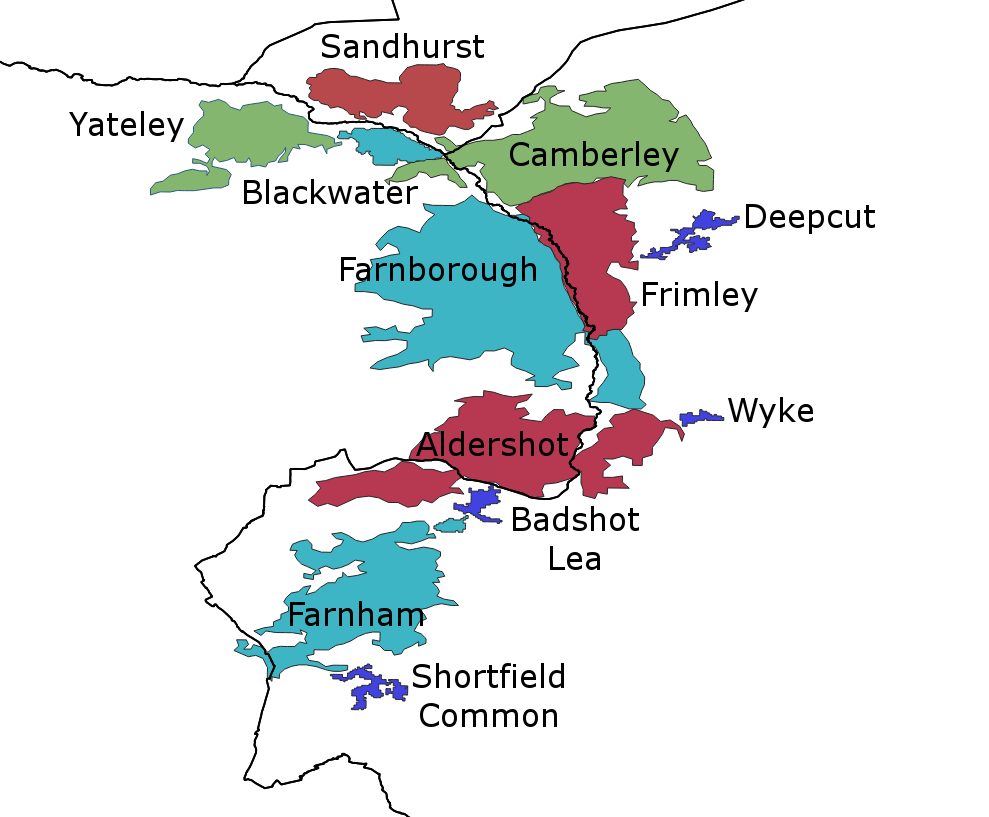
Map of Farnborough/Aldershot Built-up Area

Geography code	Area name	2011 Population	District	Notes
E35000108	Farnborough	65,034	Rushmoor, Borough of Guildford	Subdivision includes Cove and Ash Vale
E35000207	Aldershot	57,211	Rushmoor, Borough of Guildford, Borough of Waverley	Subdivision includes Ash, Hale and Tongham
E35000239	Wyke	276	Borough of Guildford	
E35000279	Sandhurst	20,495	Bracknell Forest	
E35000513	Blackwater	7,195	Hart District	
E35000638	Badshot Lea	1,582	Borough of Waverley	
E35000977	Deepcut	2,128	Surrey Heath	
E35001045	Frimley	19,094	Surrey Heath	
E35001069	Yateley	14,829	Hart District	
E35001198	Farnham	25,604	Borough of Waverley	
E35001352	Camberley	38,038	Surrey Heath	Includes the village of Hawley
E35001431	Shortfield Common	911	Borough of Waverley	
