= Edgcumbe Park =

Residential estate in Crowthorne, England

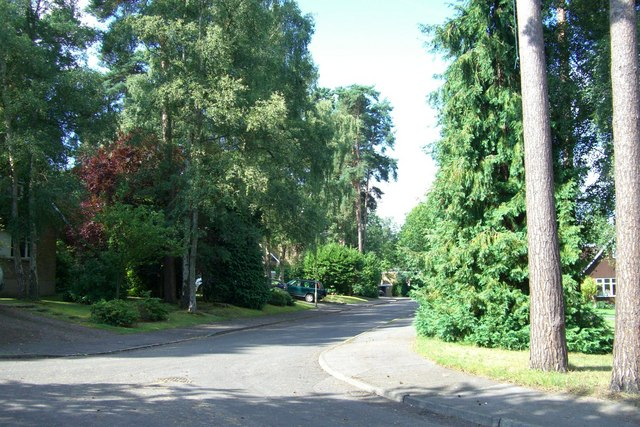
- Bramblegate, Edgcumbe Park, 2007
- Interactive map of the Edgcumbe Park area

General information
- Type: Housing estate
- Architectural style: Mid-century modern
- Location: Crowthorne, Berkshire, England
- Coordinates: 51.370°N 0.809°W
- Construction started: 1958
- Completed: 1976

Design and construction
- Architect: Thomas Hart
- Other designers: Athelstan Whaley
- Main contractor: Renway Construction Company Limited

Edgcumbe Park is an executive residential housing estate of 414 houses, chalets, bungalows and flats in Crowthorne, Berkshire, England, within Bracknell Forest and the Borough of Wokingham. It is in an area once part of Windsor Great Park. Originally built as luxury housing for middle and upper middle class professionals and families, it remains an upmarket residential development.

Edgcumbe Park is a prominent award-winning example of British mid-century modern architecture and there have been calls for a preservation order to be imposed on the estate.

== History ==
In the 1950s, a builder called Athelstan Whaley, who was the managing director of the Renway Construction Company, and its Architect, Thomas Hart, came up with the vision of designing and building a residential housing estate with Scandinavian and North American architecture situated in a woodland setting.

Renway subsequently purchased a large residential dwelling, Heathermount House in Crowthorne. It was a property which was set in a large 80-acre wood and which was formerly part of Windsor Great Park. Over the course of up to 14 years, between 1958 and 1972, it built 360 houses, chalets and bungalows and 54 flats with 27 house designs on the site, in a development called Edgcumbe Park, with its main access road named Edgcumbe Park Drive.

The estate was very carefully designed, as a lot of the alder, hawthorn, pine, mountain ash, oak, sycamore and silver birch trees had a Tree preservation order on them, meaning not many could be felled. To get around this, Renway built meandering roads with many properties not being built in a straight line against a straight street, as they had to be built either in front or behind existing trees. As a result, a lot of the properties came with large American style open front gardens, and some detached properties were built on plots which were up to a third of an acre.

Renway was very innovative, in that their homes were built with cavity walls with insulation blocks and they had dry lining, their properties also came with wall and roof insulation, warm air heating, double glazing and plastic guttering, and their dwellings had fitted kitchens and integrated wardrobes. The architecture designs were also very pioneering, as the properties came with open plan rumpus rooms, downstairs studies, en-suite bathrooms and car ports.

The properties being built were executive homes, marketed at a premium to house prices at the time. Two bedroom garden flats were originally sold for £4,750 each and large four-bedroom detached houses with double garages were originally sold for up to £15,000 each.

== Transport connections ==
Due to its close proximity to Heathrow Airport, a number of British European Airways, British Overseas Airways Corporation and Pan Am employees purchased properties on the estate.

== Awards ==
Edgcumbe Park has received many awards, for its design, construction and landscaping when it was built during the 1960s:

- ‘Ideal Home’ winner
- ‘New Home Of The Year’ winner
- Civic Trust Award winner 1968

The estate also featured in a number of publications at the time.

== Preservation ==
The Edgcumbe Park Preservation Association (EPPA), which was set up soon after the estate was built, keeps an eye on proposals for change, and the property websites Bungalow Journal and Highson have called for "formal recognition" and "true attention" respectively of the development, citing its award-winning mid-century appreciation.

In August 2021, Bracknell Forest Council published a planning document, Character Area Assessments SPD. In Chapter 3 Crowthorne study area, Area A discusses Edgcumbe Park. In it, it says "piecemeal redevelopment of individual plots or infill proposals should be avoided", "extensions, should be built in the same architectural language", "roof extensions should be in keeping with existing design", "there should be no hard enclosing features to front gardens", "the existing tree canopy is important and should be retained" and "the existing pattern of open landscaped frontages should be retained".

Despite this, in May 2025, controversial plans were revealed to re-develop 13 Linkway, a two-storey detached house into a more modern dwelling. This application has been marked as "Approved" as of 18th August 2026 and the new build will commence in the autumn of 2026. It will be in the same mid-century modern style as the rest of Edgcumbe Park, however it will be much more energy- efficient with heat pump and solar panels replacing old gas boiler and blow-air heating. It will hopefully set an architectural and energy efficiency benchmark for other houses on the development.

== Notable residents ==
- John Nike, a Bracknell businessman and leisure and hotel entrepreneur, resided at 40 Linkway in the 1960s

== See also ==
- Crowthorne
- Mid-century modern
