= London metropolitan area =

Region of England

Coordinates: 51.5°N 0.1°W

- Metropolis and metropolitan area
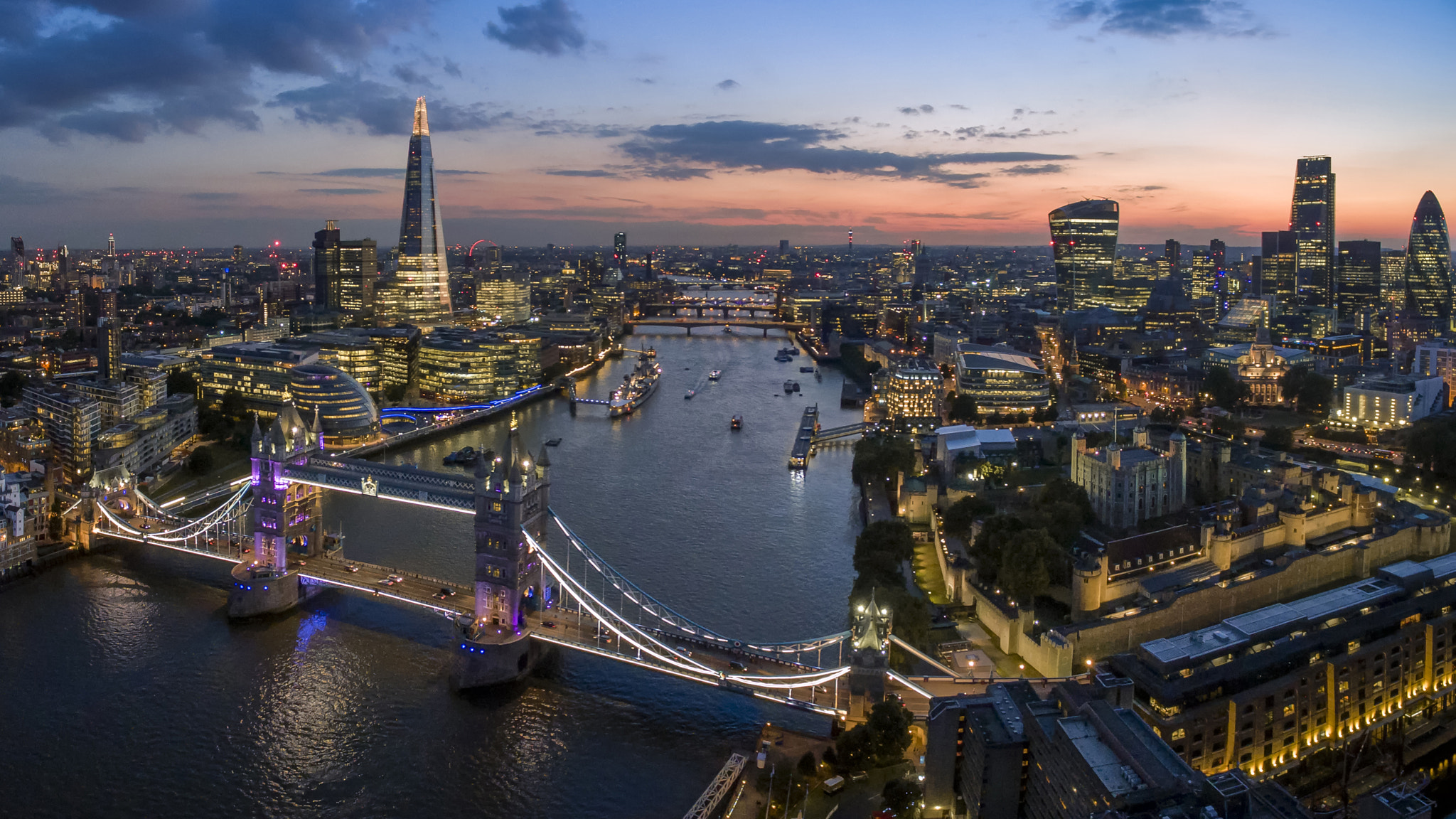
- Skyline of Central London

- Map of the London area, with the metropolitan area as defined by the London Travel to Work Area highlighted in red
- Sovereign state: United Kingdom
- Country: England

Area
  - Metro: 3,443 sq mi (8,917 km^{2})

Population (2026)
  - Metro: 15,400,000

GDP
  - Metro: US$978 billion (nominal); US$1.064 trillion (PPP)

The London metropolitan area is the metropolitan area of London, England. It has several definitions, including the London Travel to Work Area, and usually consists of the London urban area, settlements that share London's infrastructure, and places from which it is practical to commute to work in London. It is also known as the London commuter belt, or Southeast metropolitan area.

== Scope ==
The boundaries are not fixed; they expand as transport options improve and affordable housing moves further away from the city centre. The belt currently covers much of the South East region and part of the East of England region, including the home counties of Hertfordshire, Buckinghamshire, Berkshire, Surrey, Kent and Essex, and, by several definitions, Hampshire, West Sussex, East Sussex, Bedfordshire.

The resident population of Greater London and those counties (partly) within the Metropolitan Green Belt was 18,868,800 in 2011. Much of the undeveloped part of this area lies within the designated belt, which, save as to existing buildings, yards and gardens, covers nearly all of Surrey, eastern Berkshire, southern Buckinghamshire, southern and mid Hertfordshire, southern Bedfordshire, south-west Essex, and north-western Kent. Largely in these counties, three Areas of Outstanding Natural Beauty (the Chiltern Hills, Surrey Hills and North Downs AONBs) surrounding the Thames basin are within the commuter belt.

== Definitions ==
=== Travel to work area ===
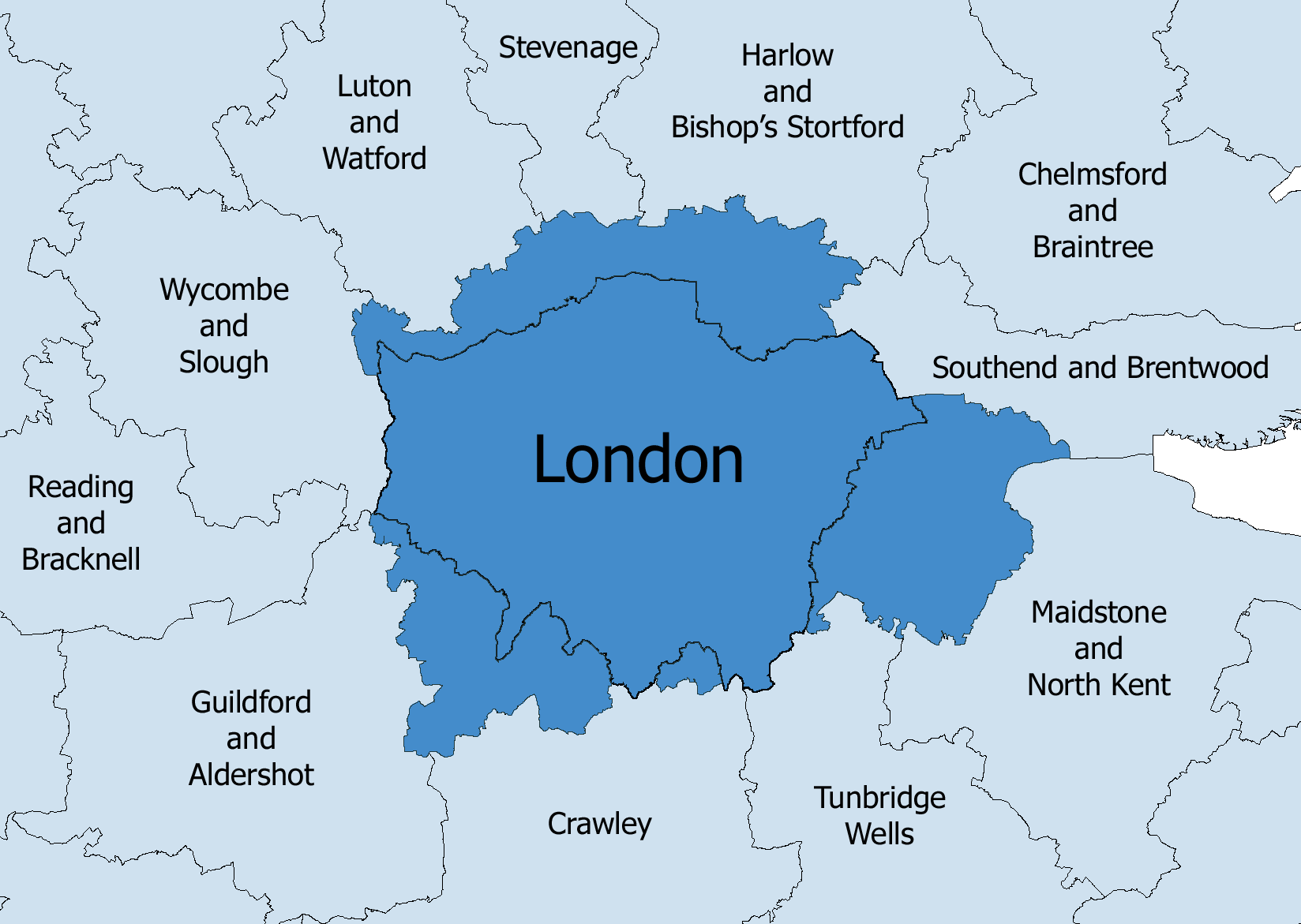
The London travel to work area in 2001 (dark blue), with the administrative boundary of Greater London shown

The London travel to work area, defined by the Office for National Statistics as the area for which "of the resident economically active population, at least 75% actually work in the area, and also, that of everyone working in the area, at least 75% actually live in the area." has a population of 9,294,800 (2005 estimate).

This TTWA excludes some parts of Greater London such as Uxbridge, Hounslow and Kingston which form part of the Heathrow TTWA. Conversely it includes areas beyond Greater London such as Rickmansworth, Broxbourne, Grays, Dartford, Gravesend and Epsom.

=== Environs of Greater London ===
There are 17 local government districts that share a boundary with Greater London, in the East and South East regions. Most districts are entirely, or have sections, within the M25 motorway or are within 15–20 miles (24–32 km) of Charing Cross.

Adjacent districts often share characteristics of Outer London, such as forming part of the continuous urban sprawl, being served by the London Underground, being covered by the London telephone area code, (until 2000) forming part of the Metropolitan Police District and having a relatively high employed population working in London.

=== London's Larger Urban Zone ===
Larger Urban Zone is a definition created in 2004 by Eurostat that measures the population and expanse of metropolitan areas across European countries. Based on the 2001 census, the population of London's Larger Urban Zone was 11.9 million, ranking it as the most populous metropolitan area in the European Union until Brexit. The districts that are considered parts of this Larger Urban Zone are listed here: (no district in Bedfordshire, Hampshire, or Sussex is included). Several large conurbations fall just outside the zone: Including the Reading built-up area, the Luton/Dunstable urban area, the High Wycombe built-up area and significant parts of the Aldershot and Crawley Urban Areas.

Districts of the Home Counties in relation to London's Larger Urban Zone
Region	County	Districts within the Zone	Districts outside the Zone	Area (km^{2})	Population
East	Hertfordshire	Broxbourne; East Hertfordshire; Dacorum; Hertsmere; Three Rivers; Stevenage; St Albans; Watford; Welwyn Hatfield	North Hertfordshire	1,267.6	1,067,049
East	Essex	Basildon; Brentwood; Castle Point; Chelmsford; Epping Forest; Harlow; Maldon; Rochford; Southend-on-Sea; Thurrock; Uttlesford	Braintree; Colchester; Tendring	2,387.5	1,335,684
South East	Kent	Dartford; Gravesham; Maidstone; Medway; Tonbridge and Malling; Tunbridge Wells; Sevenoaks	Ashford; Canterbury; Dover; Folkestone and Hythe; Swale; Thanet	1,698.4	1,055,194
South East	Surrey	Elmbridge; Epsom and Ewell; Guildford; Mole Valley; Reigate and Banstead; Runnymede; Spelthorne; Surrey Heath; Tandridge; Woking	Waverley	1,317.8	1,061,056
South East	Berkshire	Bracknell Forest; Slough; Windsor and Maidenhead	Reading; West Berkshire; Wokingham	339.4	512,535
South East	Buckinghamshire	Chiltern; South Bucks	Aylesbury; Wycombe; Milton Keynes	337.6	165,970

Note: In 2027, the districts in Surrey, as well as the administrative county, will be abolished, and replaced by two unitary authorities: East Surrey and West Surrey.

=== Urban areas within the commuter belt ===
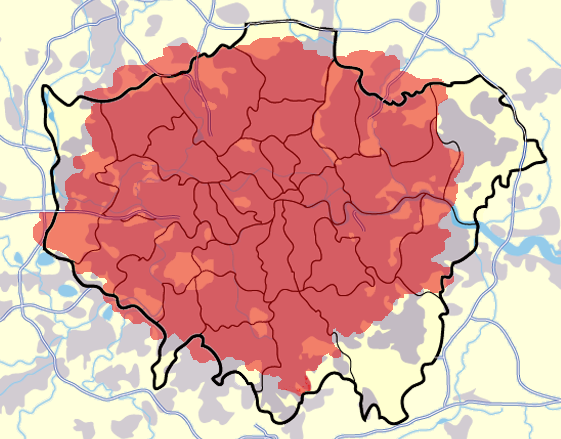
The urban area of London (grey) extends beyond the London boundary. The M25 is also shown. The 020 telephone dialling code is shown in red.

The following table lists urban areas (also known as built-up areas) considered part of the London Commuter Belt with populations over 20,000. The commuter belt contains all urban areas within an approximate 40 mile (64 km) radius of Charing Cross. Some of the outermost towns are Aylesbury, Reading, Aldershot and Maidstone.

Rank	Urban Area	Population (2011 Census)	County
1	Greater London Urban Area	9,787,426	Greater London
2	Reading/Wokingham Urban Area	318,014	Berkshire
3	Southend Urban Area	295,310	Essex
4	Medway Towns Urban Area	277,855	Kent
5	Luton/Dunstable Urban Area	258,018	Bedfordshire
6	Aldershot Urban Area	252,397	Hampshire
7	Crawley Urban Area	180,508	West Sussex
8	Slough Urban Area	163,777	Berkshire
9	Basildon/Wickford	144,859	Essex
10	High Wycombe Urban Area	133,204	Buckinghamshire
11	Chelmsford	111,511	Essex
12	Basingstoke	107,642	Hampshire
13	Maidstone	107,627	Kent
14	Stevenage	90,232	Hertfordshire
15	Grays/Tilbury	89,755	Essex
16	Aylesbury	74,748	Buckinghamshire
17	Royal Tunbridge Wells	68,910	Kent
18	Maidenhead	64,831	Berkshire
19	Welwyn Urban Area	59,910	Hertfordshire
20	Reigate/Redhill	56,621	Surrey
21	Brentwood	52,586	Essex
22	Horsham	51,472	West Sussex
23	Sittingbourne	48,948	Kent
24	Amersham/Chesham	46,122	Buckinghamshire
25	Hertford/Ware	45,457	Hertfordshire
26	Letchworth/Baldock	43,529	Hertfordshire
27	Hatfield	41,677	Hertfordshire
28	Fleet	38,726	Hampshire
29	Tonbridge	38,657	Kent
30	Canvey Island	38,170	Essex
31	Bishop's Stortford	37,838	Hertfordshire
32	Leighton Buzzard	37,469	Bedfordshire
33	Billericay	36,338	Essex
34	Hitchin	36,099	Hertfordshire
35	Haywards Heath	33,845	West Sussex
36	Windsor/Eton	33,348	Berkshire
37	Burgess Hill	30,635	West Sussex
38	Harpenden	30,240	Hertfordshire
39	Sevenoaks	29,506	Kent
40	Stanford Le Hope/Corringham	28,725	Essex
41	Ditton	25,982	Kent
42	Godalming	22,689	Surrey
43	Potters Bar	22,639	Hertfordshire
44	New Addington	22,280	Greater London
45	Berkhamsted	21,997	Hertfordshire
46	Swanley	21,839	Kent
47	Gerrards Cross/Chalfont St Peter	20,633	Buckinghamshire
48	Crowborough	20,607	East Sussex

=== Outer commuter belt ===
Some estate agents, including James Pendleton and Savills, have defined a 'second commuter belt' further away from London. The definition includes places up to approximately 55 miles (89 km) from central London, including Bedford, Brighton, Cambridge, Hastings, Margate, Milton Keynes and Oxford.

== See also ==
- Greater London Built-up Area
- Stockbroker Belt
- Home counties
- List of metropolitan areas in the United Kingdom
