= Greater Reading =

Greater Reading may refer to:

- the Reading Metropolitan Area of Reading, Pennsylvania, USA
- the Reading built-up area of Reading, Berkshire, UK
