= GU postcode area =

Postcode area within the United Kingdom

Guildford
- Postcode area
- Coordinates: 51.222°N 0.718°W
- Country: United Kingdom
- Postcode area: GU
- Postcode area name: Guildford
- Post towns: 24
- Postcode districts: 40
- Postcode sectors: 144
- Postcodes (live): 22,119
- Postcodes (total): 35,570
- Statistics as at May 2020

The GU postcode area, also known as the Guildford postcode area, is a group of 38 postcode districts in South East England, within 24 post towns. These cover west Surrey (including Guildford, Woking, Godalming, Cranleigh, Farnham, Camberley, Lightwater, Bagshot, Windlesham, Virginia Water, Hindhead and Haslemere), east Hampshire (including Aldershot, Farnborough, Fleet, Yateley, Petersfield, Alton, Bordon, Liphook and Liss), northwestern West Sussex (including Petworth and Midhurst) and a small part of south-east Berkshire (including Sandhurst).

Mail for this area is sorted at the Jubilee Mail Centre in Hounslow.

== Coverage ==
The approximate coverage of the postcode districts:

Postcode district	Post town	Coverage	Local authority area(s)
GU1	GUILDFORD	Guildford Town Centre, Slyfield, Merrow, Burpham	Guildford
GU2	GUILDFORD	Guildford Park, Onslow Village, Park Barn, University of Surrey	Guildford
GU3	GUILDFORD	Normandy, Puttenham, Worplesdon, Christmas Pie, Flexford	Guildford
GU4	GUILDFORD	Burpham, Chilworth, Jacobs Well, Shalford	Guildford
GU5	GUILDFORD	Albury, Bramley, Shere	Guildford, Waverley
GU6	CRANLEIGH	Cranleigh, Ewhurst, Alfold	Waverley
GU7	GODALMING	Farncombe, Godalming	Waverley
GU8	GODALMING	Chiddingfold, Dunsfold, Elstead, Hascombe, Milford, Thursley, Witley	Waverley
GU9	FARNHAM	Farnham, Badshot Lea, Hale, Heath End	Waverley
GU10	FARNHAM	Bentley, Frensham, Churt, Crondall, Tongham, Ewshot, Seale, Tilford, Wrecclesham	Waverley, East Hampshire, Guildford, Hart
GU11	ALDERSHOT	Aldershot	Rushmoor
GU12	ALDERSHOT	Aldershot, Ash, Ash Green, Ash Vale	Rushmoor, Guildford
GU14	FARNBOROUGH	Farnborough, Cove, North Camp, Southwood	Rushmoor
GU15	CAMBERLEY	Camberley, Old Dean, RMAS	Surrey Heath, Bracknell Forest
GU16	CAMBERLEY	Frimley, Frimley Green, Deepcut, Mytchett	Surrey Heath
GU17	CAMBERLEY	Blackwater, Hawley, Minley, Darby Green, Frogmore, Blackbushe	Hart
GU18	LIGHTWATER	Lightwater	Surrey Heath
GU19	BAGSHOT	Bagshot	Surrey Heath
GU20	WINDLESHAM	Windlesham	Surrey Heath
GU21	WOKING	Woking (north), Knaphill, St. John's, Horsell, Goldsworth Park	Woking
GU22	WOKING	Woking (south), Pyrford, Hook Heath, Mayford, Old Woking	Woking
GU23	WOKING	Send, Ripley, Ockham, Wisley	Guildford
GU24	WOKING	Bisley, Pirbright, Chobham, Knaphill, Brookwood, West End	Woking, Surrey Heath, Guildford
GU25	VIRGINIA WATER	Virginia Water, Wentworth	Runnymede
GU26	HINDHEAD	Hindhead, Bramshott Chase, Grayshott	Waverley, East Hampshire
GU27	HINDHEAD		non-geographic
GU27	HASLEMERE	Haslemere, Fernhurst, Shottermill, Grayswood	Waverley, Chichester
GU28	PETWORTH	Petworth, Graffham, Northchapel, Byworth, Lodsworth	Chichester
GU29	MIDHURST	Midhurst, Cocking, Easebourne	Chichester
GU30	LIPHOOK	Liphook, Bramshott, Conford, Linch, Milland, Passfield	East Hampshire, Chichester
GU31	PETERSFIELD	Petersfield (east), Buriton, East Harting, South Harting, Elsted, Rogate	East Hampshire, Chichester
GU32	PETERSFIELD	Petersfield (west and town centre), East Meon, West Meon, Sheet, Steep	East Hampshire, Winchester
GU33	LISS	Liss, Greatham, Selborne, Rake	East Hampshire, Chichester
GU34	ALTON	Alton, Beech, Bentworth, Medstead, Four Marks, Golden Pot, Lasham	East Hampshire
GU35	BORDON	Bordon, Headley, Headley Down, Lindford, Oakhanger, Kingsley, Arford, Whitehill	East Hampshire
GU46	YATELEY	Yateley	Hart
GU47	SANDHURST	Sandhurst, College Town, Owlsmoor, Little Sandhurst	Bracknell Forest
GU51	FLEET	Fleet, Elvetham Heath	Hart
GU52	FLEET	Church Crookham, Crookham Village	Hart
GU95	CAMBERLEY	British Gas	non-geographic

The original GU13 district for Fleet was recoded to GU51 and GU52 in 2001.

== Map ==
GU postcode area map, showing postcode districts in red and post towns in grey text, with links to nearby BN, KT, PO, RG, RH, SL, SO and TW postcode areas.

== See also ==
- Postcode Address File
- List of postcode areas in the United Kingdom
