= College Town, Berkshire =

Suburb of Sandhurst in Berkshire, England

Coordinates: 51.342466°N 0.776347°W

College Town
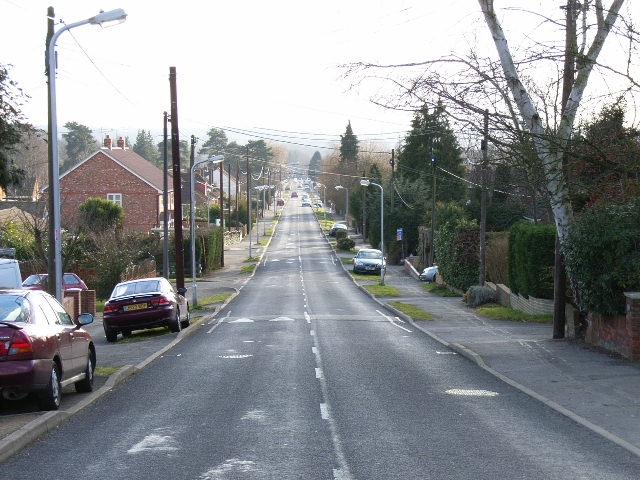
- College Road

- Location within Berkshire
- OS grid reference: SU850614
- Unitary authority: Bracknell Forest
- Ceremonial county: Berkshire
- Region: South East
- Country: England
- Sovereign state: United Kingdom
- Post town: SANDHURST
- Postcode district: GU47
- Dialling code: 01276
- Police: Thames Valley
- Fire: Royal Berkshire
- Ambulance: South Central
- UK Parliament: Bracknell

College Town is a suburb of Sandhurst in Berkshire, England. It is within the boundaries of Sandhurst Parish Council and Bracknell Forest. The settlement lies north of the A321 road and directly west of the Royal Military Academy Sandhurst.

College Town is home to a large and well-known out-of-town mercantile development, "The Meadows", which was built in 1988. It comprises a large Tesco Extra hypermarket and a Marks & Spencer, two of the largest in the country.

College Town is also home to one coeducational school, College Town Primary School, located on Branksome Hill Road. The headteacher is Mrs Trudi Sammons.
