= Stockbroker Belt =

Area of London

Coordinates: 51°15′N 0°25′W

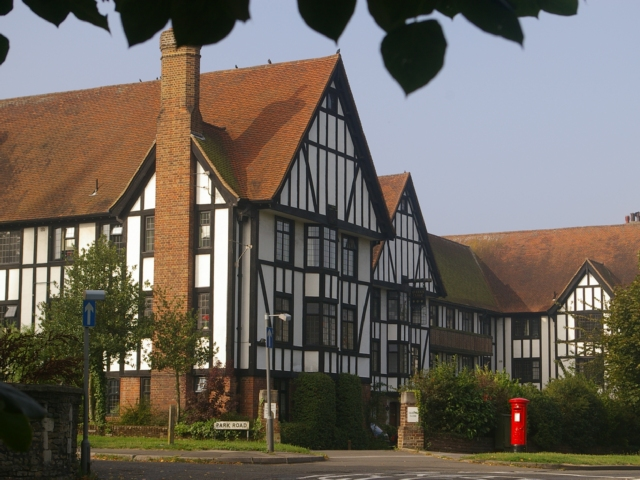
An apartment building in Esher, considered to be part of the stockbroker belt

The Stockbroker Belt is a loosely defined region overlapping the borders of the London metropolitan area and the commuter region surrounding Greater London, particularly in the vicinity of Surrey to the south-west of the city in South East England. While the term "Stockbroker Belt" has been stated to be synonymous with Surrey, it has also been more broadly defined to refer to any wealthy London commuter area, or even as a generic term for any wealthy commuter suburb.

The region takes its name from the history of affluent central London financiers who would commute in from these more rural neighbourhoods. The archetypal large housing defining such a belt is noted for its premium on top of national house prices (among comparator places of similar mid-to-low population density). These match amenity-equivalent parts of London. Due to a high proportion of such housing and many amenities most of the Borough of Elmbridge in Surrey has been described as the "Beverly Hills" of the United Kingdom, drawing comparison to the affluent neighbourhood in California. In 2014, 28 of the 30 highest income areas in Britain were "Stockbroker Belt" towns.

== See also ==
- Greater London Built-up Area
- Metropolitan Green Belt
- Stockbroker
