= Ambarrow Court =

Local Nature Reserve in Berkshire, England

Coordinates: 51.356°N 0.817°W

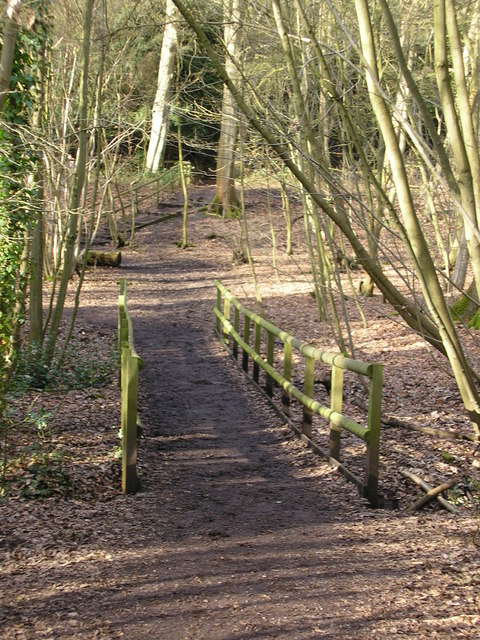
- Interactive map of Ambarrow Court
- Type: Local Nature Reserve
- Location: Little Sandhurst, Berkshire
- OS grid: SU 825 625
- Area: 7.8 hectares (19 acres)
- Manager: Bracknell Forest Borough Council

Ambarrow Court is a 7.8-hectare (19-acre) Local Nature Reserve in Little Sandhurst in Berkshire. It is owned and managed by Bracknell Forest Borough Council.

== Geography and site ==
The site contains many habitats including ancient woodland, hazel coppice, marshes, ponds and pools, birch coppice and meadow. As well as the variety of different environments you can also see the foundations of the original Victorian Manor that stood on the grounds.

The reserve also features a permanent orienteering course and Geocaching points.

== History ==
There was a Victorian Manor built on the area in 1885 for Lt Col George Sheppard Harvey and his wife Edith. It was built as his retirement home after having served his country in the Royal Artillery.

Col Harvey died in 1902 and left the house to his wife, who died in 1932, eight years later it was taken over by the Royal Aircraft Establishment. The Royal Aircraft Establishment continued to use the site until 1969 when it was closed down. In 1970 the house was demolished.

In 1986 Bracknell Council took over the southern part of the estate, opening it up for recreation and providing the car park.

In 2002 the site was declared a local nature reserve by Bracknell Forest Council.

== Fauna ==
The site has the following fauna:

=== Mammals ===
- Common noctule

=== Invertebrates ===
- Stag beetle

== Flora ==
The site has the following flora:

=== Trees ===
- Corylus avellana
- Taxus baccata
- Cedar
- Douglas fir

=== Plants ===
- Hyacinthoides non-scripta
- Galanthus nivalis
- Cardamine pratensis
- Rhinanthus minor
