= Newbold School =

Location
- Popeswood Road; Binfield, Bracknell, Berkshire, RG42 4AH; England; 51.422°N 0.784°W

Information
- Type: Private
- Motto: Virtute et Labore
- Religious affiliations: Christian, Seventh-day Adventist
- Established: 1941
- Department for Education URN: 110141 Tables
- Ofsted: Reports
- Chairman of Governors: Marcel Ghioalda
- Headteacher: Jacqueline Crissey
- Staff: 15
- Gender: Mixed-sex education
- Age: 3 to 11
- Enrolment: 56
- Capacity: 100 As of 2025
- Colours: Maroon & Gold
- Website: www.newboldschool.co.uk

Newbold School is a private fee-paying primary school in Binfield, near Bracknell, Berkshire. The school is owned and run by the Seventh-day Adventist Church, and is linked to Newbold Seventh-day Adventist Church and Newbold College of Higher Education.

== History ==
The school was established in 1941 at Newbold Revel near Rugby, Warwickshire; its purpose was to teach the children of people who were themselves students at Newbold College. Both institutions moved to Binfield in Berkshire in 1946.

The school buildings were expanded in 1978. Additions to the school were proposed in 2018.

As of 2025, the school's last inspection by Ofsted was in 2023, with a judgement of outstanding.

== Headteachers of Newbold School ==
- 1978 - ? Sherard Wilson
- 1989 - 2006 Maurice Brooks
- 2008 - 2009 Vicky Chilvers
- 2009 - 2011 Pat Eastwood
- 2011 - 2014 Ruth Ohman
- 2014–present Jacqueline Crissey
