= Crowthorne =

Village in Berkshire, England

Coordinates: 51.370°N 0.792°W

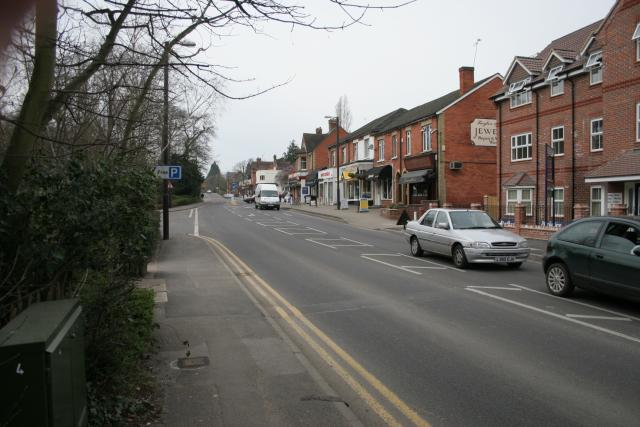
- The shops in Duke's Ride near Crowthorne Station

- Location within Berkshire
- Population: 7,806 (2021 census)
- OS grid reference: SU841641
- Civil parish: Crowthorne
- Unitary authority: Bracknell Forest and Wokingham
- Ceremonial county: Berkshire
- Region: South East
- Country: England
- Sovereign state: United Kingdom
- Post town: CROWTHORNE
- Postcode district: RG45
- Dialling code: 01344
- Police: Thames Valley
- Fire: Royal Berkshire
- Ambulance: South Central
- UK Parliament: Bracknell

Crowthorne is a village, and civil parish, in the Bracknell Forest district of southeastern Berkshire, England. It had a population of 7,806 at the 2021 census.

Crowthorne is the location of Wellington College, a large co-educational boarding and day independent school, which opened in 1859, and of Broadmoor Hospital, one of England's three maximum-security psychiatric hospitals, which lies on the eastern edge of the village.

== History ==
Crowthorne was only a hamlet until Wellington College opened in 1859 and Broadmoor Hospital in 1863. Crowthorne was originally part of the parish of Sandhurst, and acquired its name as the postal authority wished to give it a name to facilitate deliveries from Wokingham, instead of post coming from York Town (which with Cambridge Town became known as Camberley). "Albertonville" was suggested in honour of the Prince Consort, but the suggestion of "Crowthorne", after thorn trees at Brookers Corner at the top of the village, was adopted. There was a Crowthorne Farm prior to this, and it appeared as a separate holding in the Royal Forest of Windsor in the Domesday Book, although the present farm buildings do not date back to this time.

Crowthorne railway station, originally Wellington College for Crowthorne Station, opened in 1860 and burgeoned quickly.

Edgcumbe Park, a prominent award-winning housing estate and an example of British mid-century modern architecture, was constructed off Dukes Ride in Crowthorne between 1958 and 1972 by the Renway Construction Company.

In the 1960s, the Transport Research Laboratory established by the UK Government as the Road Research Laboratory (RRL) opened in Crowthorne. It was privatised in 1996.

== Geography ==
Crowthorne is part of the Reading/Wokingham Urban Area. It lies 4 miles (6.5 km) NNE of Camberley and some 5 miles (8 km) SSW of Bracknell. The Crowthorne urban area spills over into the neighbouring parish of Wokingham Without. However, most of the housing is in Crowthorne parish, which is part of Bracknell Forest district. North of Crowthorne is Pinewood, which has a leisure centre, cafe and miniature railway.

== Natural environment ==
The Crowthorne urban area adjoins several Sites of Special Scientific Interest (SSSI) and local nature reserves:

- Heath Lake along its northern edge, in Wokingham Without.
- Sandhurst to Owlsmoor Bogs and Heaths form an SSSI to the south-east, mostly in Sandhurst.

== Schools ==
Crowthorne houses Wellington College, a large co-educational boarding and day independent school, opened in 1859 as a monument to the Duke of Wellington (1769–1852). It became fully coeducational in 2005. Edgbarrow is a secondary school and there are 5 primary schools: Hatch Ride Primary, New Scotland Hill, Crowthorne Church of England School, Wildmoor Heath (formerly Broadmoor Primary) and Oaklands Junior. There are some pre-preparatory and preparatory schools, nurseries and childcare centres for children between 3 months and 11 years old.

== Aeronautics ==
C. F. Taylor grew into a large international aeronautical fabrications business, later part of British Aerospace. It was born in a shed of the Buckler premises in Heath Hill Road shortly after World War II. Metal craftsman C. F. Taylor single-handedly produced aluminium racing fairings for motorcycles and bodies for early Buckler cars.

== Local societies and community groups ==
Crowthorne holds a biennial carnival, usually in early July, organised by the Crowthorne Carnival Association, with some individual events put up by local schools, groups and businesses. Crowthorne Amateur Theatrical Society was founded in 1978. The Crowthorne Symphony Orchestra, conducted by Robert Roscoe, gives three concerts a year, usually at Wellington College. It also holds an open workshop for full orchestra in September and a string workshop in May. The orchestra marked its 20th anniversary in 2011. The Crowthorne Natural History Group, founded in 1977, held its final meeting in 2013, due to a diminishing, ageing membership.

== Sports ==
Crowthorne & Crown Wood Cricket Club was formed in January 2014 as a merger of two existing clubs. It plays its home games in the grounds of Wellington College and at Crown Wood's established base at St Sebastian's. It belongs to the Saturday League Cricket in the Berkshire League and Sunday Friendlies. In 2013, Crowthorne CC fielded two Saturday teams for the first time, along with a Sunday Team and a Midweek T20 team, while Crown Wood CC fielded two League teams and a youth set-up. The 1st XI gained promotion from Division 2 in 2013 after winning the League. Crown Wood's existing youth set-up continues under the merged club.

AFC Crowthorne is one of the local football teams that play home games at Morgan Recreation ground.

Crowthorne RFC is a local rugby union club, which has played at New Nest, Lower Broadmoor Road, since its construction in 2019.

== Notable residents ==
In order of birth:

- A. C. Benson (1862–1925), essayist and scholar, was born at Wellington College. His father, Edward White Benson, was its first headmaster.
- A. Duncan Carse (1875 or 1876–1938), Artist.
- Frank Sherwood Taylor (1897–1956), museum curator, died here.
- Freeman Dyson (1923–2020), theoretical physicist and mathematician, born in the village.
- Sir Anthony Seldon (born 1953), headmaster of Wellington College, political author.
