= Forest Park, Bracknell Forest =

Coordinates: 51.401330°N 0.725946°W

Forest Park
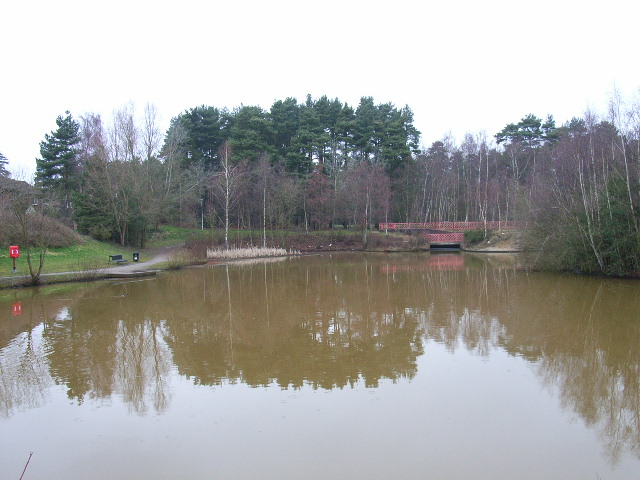
- Savernake Pond

- Location within Berkshire
- OS grid reference: SU887676
- Unitary authority: Bracknell Forest
- Ceremonial county: Berkshire
- Region: South East
- Country: England
- Sovereign state: United Kingdom
- Post town: BRACKNELL
- Postcode district: RG12
- Dialling code: 01344
- Police: Thames Valley
- Fire: Royal Berkshire
- Ambulance: South Central
- UK Parliament: Bracknell

Forest Park is a suburb of Bracknell, in Berkshire, England. It is part of the Swinley Forest ward and named after the Crown Estate of Swinley Forest. It was built in the late 1980s as the town continued to expand.

The estate lies east of the A322 road and is approximately 1.2 miles (1.9 km) south-east of Bracknell town centre.

Facilities include a shopping centre, community centre , The Woodcutters public house and a Tesco Express. Savernake Pond offers walking and a play area .
