= Sandhurst School =

Location
- Owlsmoor Road; Sandhurst, Berkshire, GU47 0SD; England; 51.350937°N 0.782007°W

Information
- Type: Academy
- Motto: The opportunity to succeed
- Established: 1969
- Status: Open
- Local authority: Bracknell Forest
- Trust: Corvus Learning Trust
- Department for Education URN: 148850 Tables
- Ofsted: Reports
- Headteacher: Gareth Croxon
- Gender: Coeducational
- Age: 11 to 18
- Enrolment: 1073
- Houses: Bailey, Gemini, Romer, and Young
- Colours: Green & Blue
- Website: https://www.sandhurstschool.org.uk

Sandhurst School is a coeducational secondary school located in Sandhurst, Berkshire, England. The headteacher is Gareth Croxon.

== History ==
The school was opened in 1969. The first headteacher was Bill Dally. He retired from the post in 1982.

An extension was added to the school in 1971 to accommodate an additional 200 pupils and a youth wing.

In 1984, teachers at the school held a "work-in" in the context of strike action. This was intended to show people how much work teachers do in their own time.

In 1986, a siren was installed at the school, to be sounded if a patient escapes from Broadmoor Hospital. As of recently the siren has been decommissioned and does not sound.

In 2020, the drama studio roof collapsing meant pupils had to move to temporary classrooms.

Previously a community school administered by Bracknell Forest Council, in February 2022 Sandhurst School converted to academy status. It is now sponsored by the Corvus Learning Trust.

== Ofsted inspections ==
As of 2025, the school's most recent Ofsted inspection was in 2024, with an overall judgement of Good.
