= Heath Lake =

Lake in Berkshire, England

- Site of Special Scientific Interest
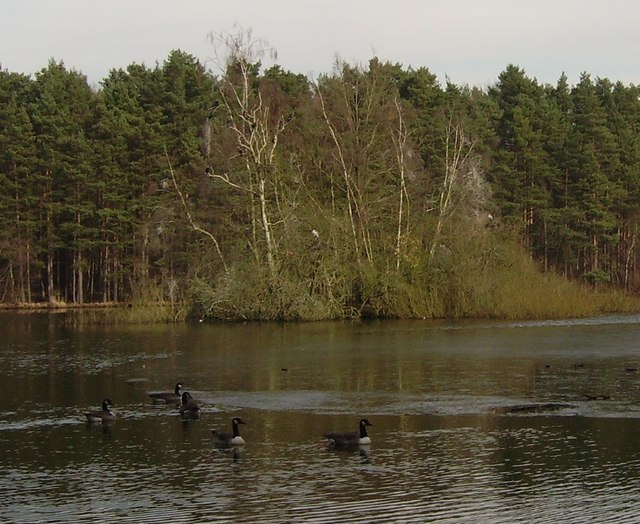

- Location within Berkshire
- Location of Heath Lake.
- Area of search: Berkshire
- Grid reference: SU 828 652
- Coordinates: 51.380°N 0.812°W
- Interest: Biological
- Area: 6.0 hectares (15 acres)
- Notification date: 1989
- Location map: Magic Map

Heath Lake is a 6-hectare (15-acre) biological Site of Special Scientific Interest (SSSI) in Berkshire. The SSSI is part of the 22.3-hectare (55-acre) Heathlake Local Nature Reserve, which is owned and managed by Wokingham Borough Council.

Most of this 2.8-hectare (7-acre) lake is less than 1-metre (3-foot) deep. It is the only acid lake in the county which retains its characteristic plants, such as alternate water-milfoil and six-stamened waterwort. The banks are peaty and marshy in some areas. There are also small areas of woodland, dry heath and acid grassland.

There is access from Nine Mile Ride.

== Fauna ==
The site has the following animals

=== Birds ===
- Cormorant
- Heron
- Mallard
- Great crested grebe
- Tufted duck
- Common kingfisher
- Coot
- Moorhen

=== Invertebrates ===
- Brown hawker
- Common darter
- Black-tailed skimmer

== Flora ==
The site has the following Flora:

=== Tree ===
- Scots pine
- oak
- rowan
- crab apple
- Guelder-rose
- alder buckthorn
- Salix purpurea

=== Plant ===
- Myriophyllum alterniflorum
- Elatine hexandra
- Eleogiton fluitans
- Potamogeton obtusifolius
- Potamogeton pusillus
- Littorella uniflora
- Ranunculus flammula
- Galium palustre
- Lotus uliginosus
- Mentha aquatica
- Juncus effusus
- Iris pseudacorus
- Juncus acutiflorus
- Juncus bulbosus
- Carex echinata
- Hydrocotyle vulgaris
- Lysimachia tenella (syn. Anagallis tenella)
- Molinia caerulea
- Erica tetralix
- Pilularia globulifera
- Equisetum fluviatile
- Ranunculus omiophyllus
- Calluna vulgaris
- Erica cinerea
- Scutellaria minor
- Succisa pratensis
