= Reading built-up area =

Coordinates: 51.44°N 0.90°W

Reading/Wokingham Urban Area within Berkshire

The Reading Built-up Area or Reading/Wokingham Urban Area is a name given by the Office for National Statistics to a conurbation in Berkshire, England, with a population of 318,014 in 2011. This was a significant decrease from the population according to the 2001 census of 369,804 due to Bracknell no longer being considered part of the built-up area, but forming part of the Greater London Urban Area instead.

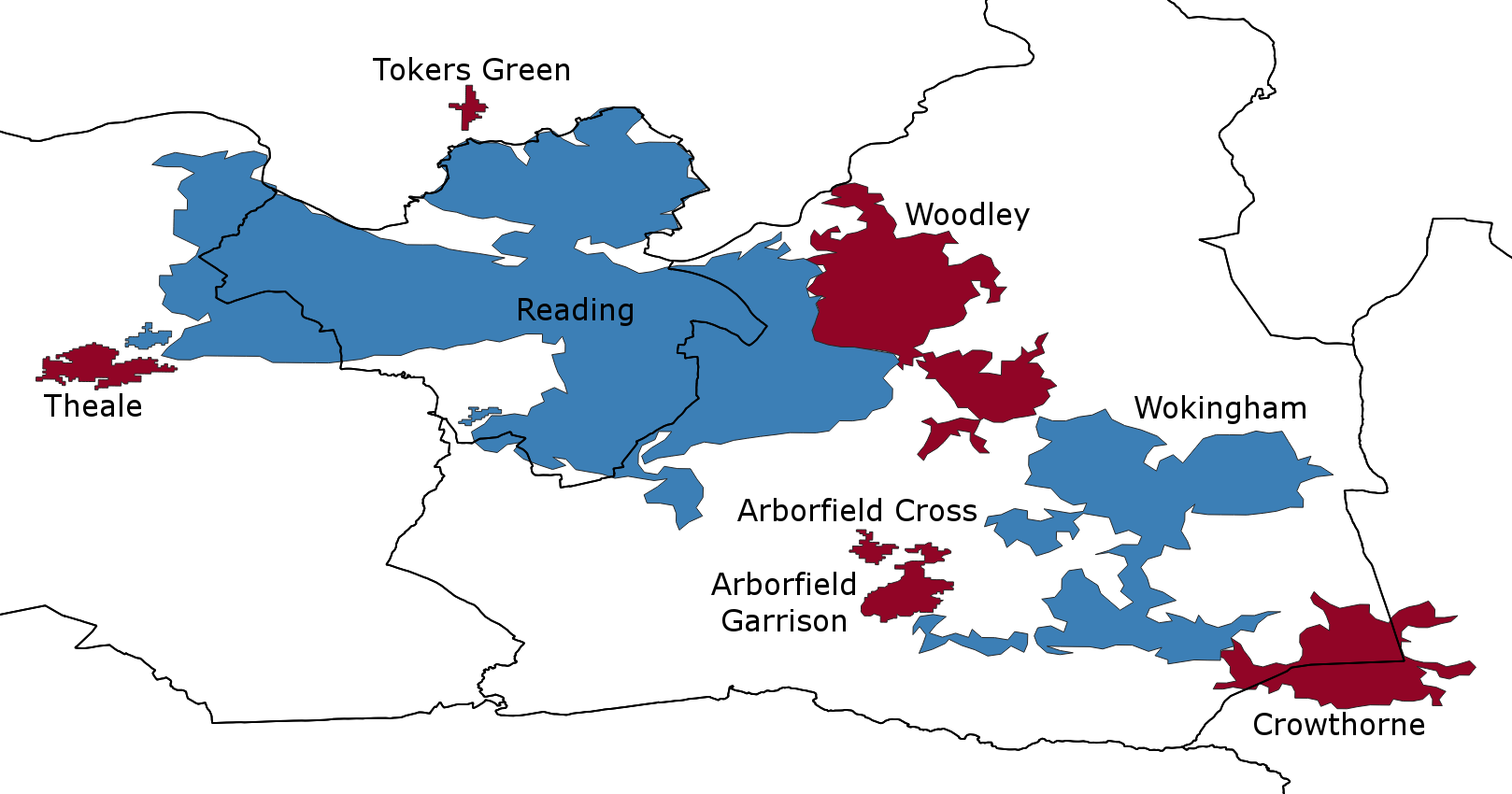
Map of Reading's built-up area with local government boundaries

Its largest population centre is Reading, and it also includes Arborfield, Woodley, Theale, Crowthorne, Earley and Wokingham.

Part of the urban area, Crowthorne, is just to the north of Sandhurst, part of the Farnborough/Aldershot Urban Area, and its eastern extremity is just west of Bracknell part of the Greater London Urban Area.
