= Edgbarrow Woods =

Woodland in Berkshire, England

Coordinates: 51.360°N 0.804°W

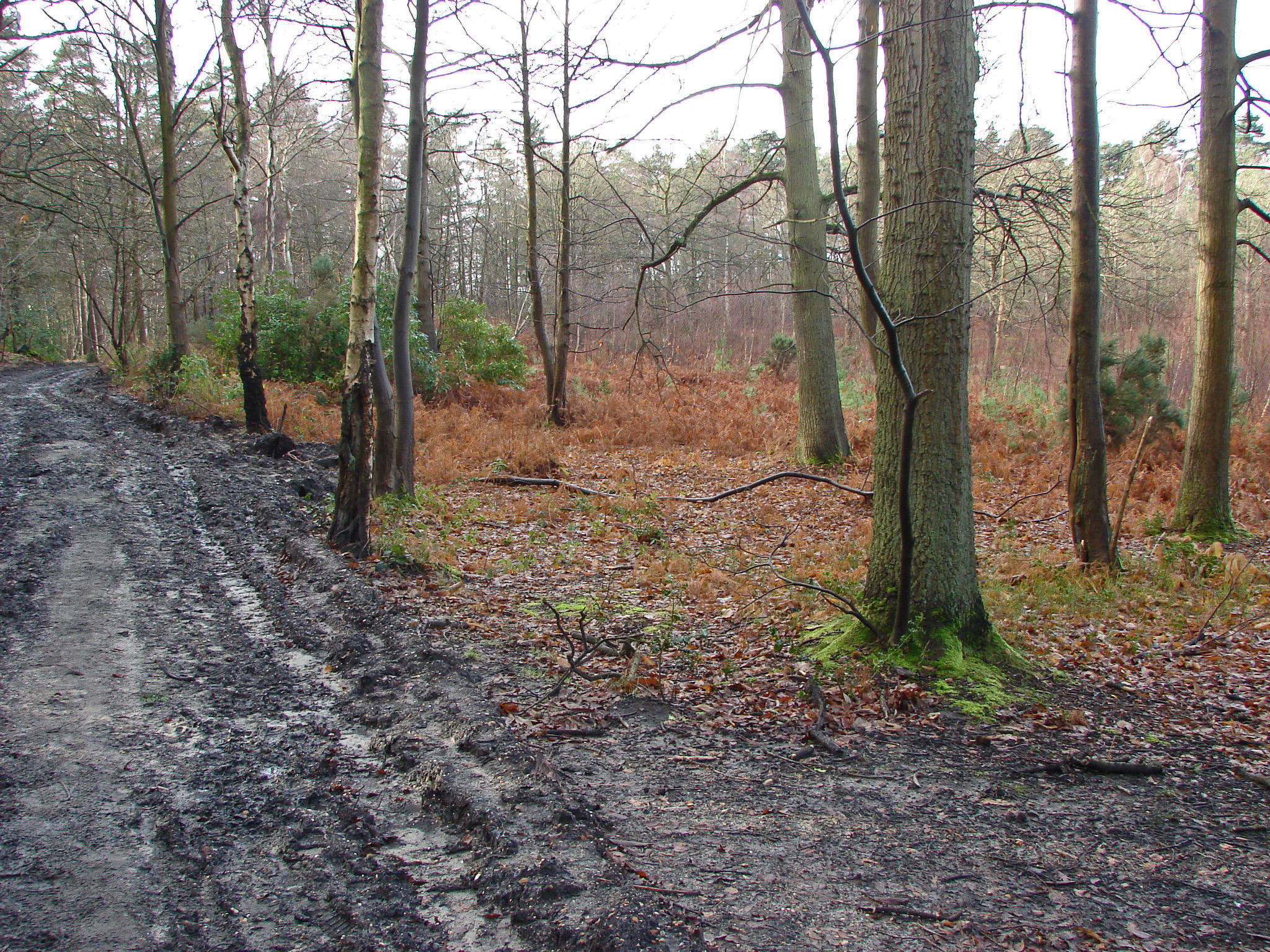
- Interactive map of Edgbarrow Woods
- Type: Local Nature Reserve
- Location: Sandhurst, Berkshire
- OS grid: SU 833 628
- Area: 36.8 hectares (91 acres)
- Manager: Wellington College

Edgbarrow Woods is a 36.8-hectare (91-acre) Local Nature Reserve on the northern outskirts of Sandhurst in Berkshire. It is owned and managed by Wellington College.

== Geography and site ==
This site contains many habitats, including semi-natural high forest, wet and dry heathland and acidic, unimproved, lowland grassland.

== History ==
The area has royal associations, being a former royal hunting ground created in the 11th century by William the Conqueror.

In 2002 the site was declared as a local nature reserve by Bracknell Forest Borough Council.

== Fauna ==
The site has the following fauna:

=== Mammals ===
- Common noctule

=== Invertebrates ===
- Silver-studded blue

=== Birds ===
- Eurasian bullfinch
- Eurasian hobby
- Dartford warbler

== Flora ==
The site has the following special flora amongst others:

- Succisa pratensis or devil's-bit scabious
- Drosera rotundifolia or common sundew
