= Sandhurst, Berkshire =

Town in Berkshire, England

Coordinates: 51.349°N 0.800°W

Sandhurst
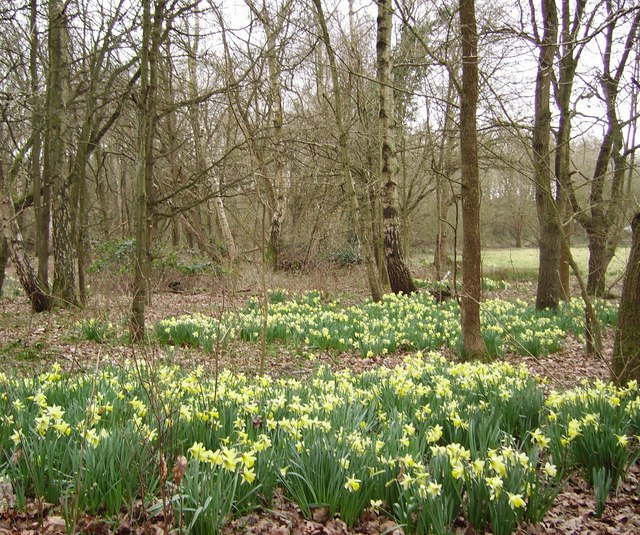
- Daffodills in Ambarrow Court

- Location within Berkshire
- Population: 20,383 (2021 Census)
- OS grid reference: SU836618
- Civil parish: Sandhurst
- Unitary authority: Bracknell Forest
- Shire county: Berkshire
- Region: South East
- Country: England
- Sovereign state: United Kingdom
- Post town: SANDHURST
- Postcode district: GU47
- Dialling code: 01344; 01276; 01252
- Police: Thames Valley
- Fire: Royal Berkshire
- Ambulance: South Central
- UK Parliament: Bracknell

Sandhurst is a town and civil parish in the Bracknell Forest borough in Berkshire, England. It is in the south eastern corner of Berkshire, and is situated 32 miles (51 km) west-southwest of London, 3 miles (4.8 km) north west of Camberley and 5 miles (8.0 km) south of Bracknell. Sandhurst is known worldwide as the location of the Royal Military Academy Sandhurst (often referred to simply as "Sandhurst", "The Academy" or "The RMA"). Despite its close proximity to Camberley, Sandhurst is also home to a large and well-known out-of-town mercantile development. The site is named "The Meadows" .

== Geography ==
Sandhurst

Climate chart (precipitation, max. and min. temperature)
J	F	M	A	M	J	J	A	S	O	N	D
4.8 7 2	3.9 8 2	3.1 11 3	3.8 13 4	3.1 17 7	3.6 20 10	3.4 22 12	13 22 12	4.2 18 10	6.1 14 7	5 10 4	4.9 8 3
- █ Average max. and min. temperatures in °C
- █ Precipitation totals in mm
- Source: MSN Weather
Imperial conversion
J	F	M	A	M	J	J	A	S	O	N	D
0.2 45 36	0.2 46 36	0.1 52 37	0.2 55 39	0.1 63 45	0.1 68 50	0.1 72 54	0.5 72 54	0.2 64 50	0.2 57 45	0.2 50 39	0.2 46 37
- █ Average max. and min. temperatures in °F
- █ Precipitation totals in inches

Sandhurst is in South East England near the junction of Berkshire, Hampshire, and Surrey. The town has four main districts, from west to east: Little Sandhurst, Sandhurst (central), and College Town, with Owlsmoor to the northeast. North of the town are Edgbarrow Woods and a Site of Special Scientific Interest (SSSI) called Sandhurst to Owlsmoor Bogs and Heaths which includes the nature reserve of Wildmoor Heath. To the east is Broadmoor Bottom, an expanse of heathland together with fir tree plantations. This backs onto the high-security Broadmoor Hospital.

Sandhurst is bordered, on the south, by the River Blackwater, and several of the Yateley Lakes along its course are within the parish, notably Trilakes with its country park. This is also the county boundary with Hampshire at Blackwater. The town of Crowthorne is to the north, the village of Finchampstead to the west, and Camberley, across the Surrey county boundary, is on its southeastern side. This is the closest sizeable town, though Sandhurst is also only 9.5 km (5.9 mi) south of the new town of Bracknell. The soil is sandy, with a subsoil of sand and gravel.

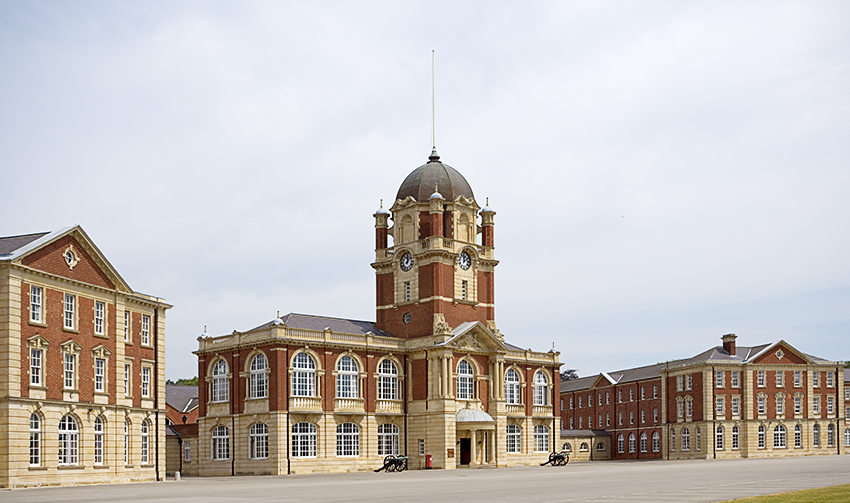
New College buildings

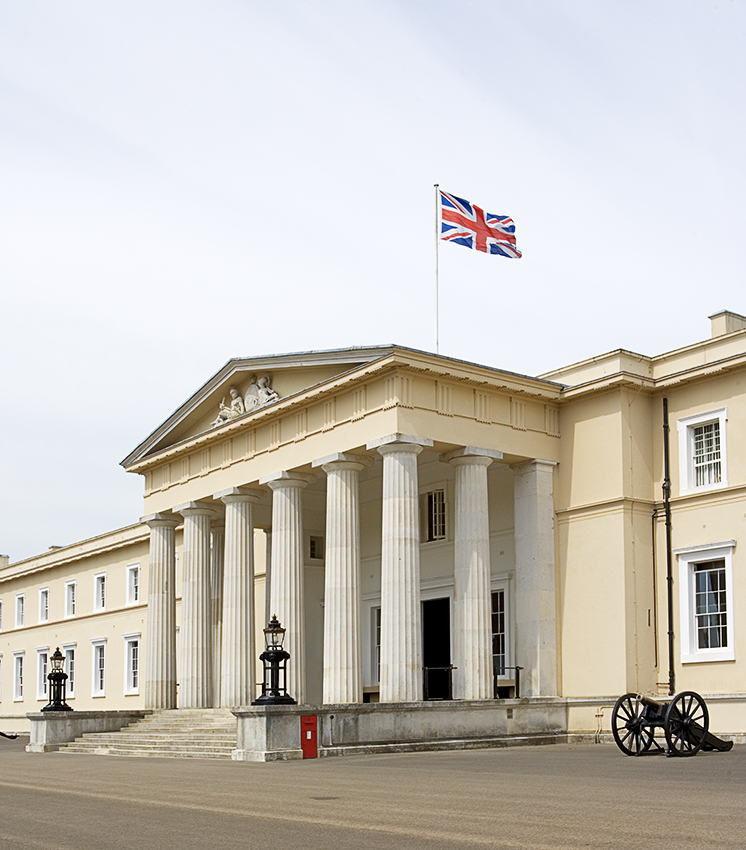
Old College buildings

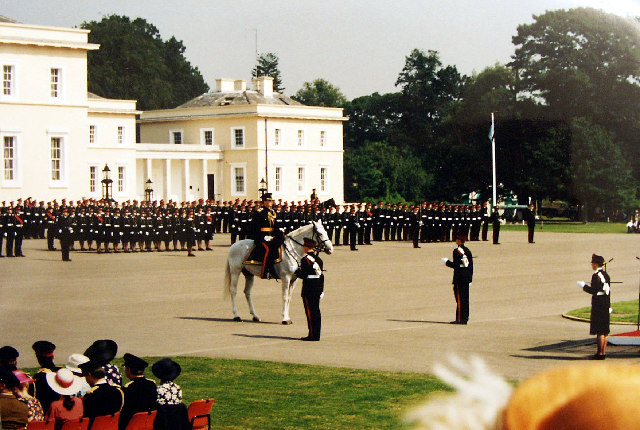
Passing out parade

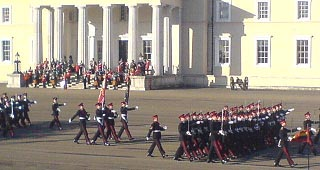
The 149th Sovereign's Parade in front of Old College

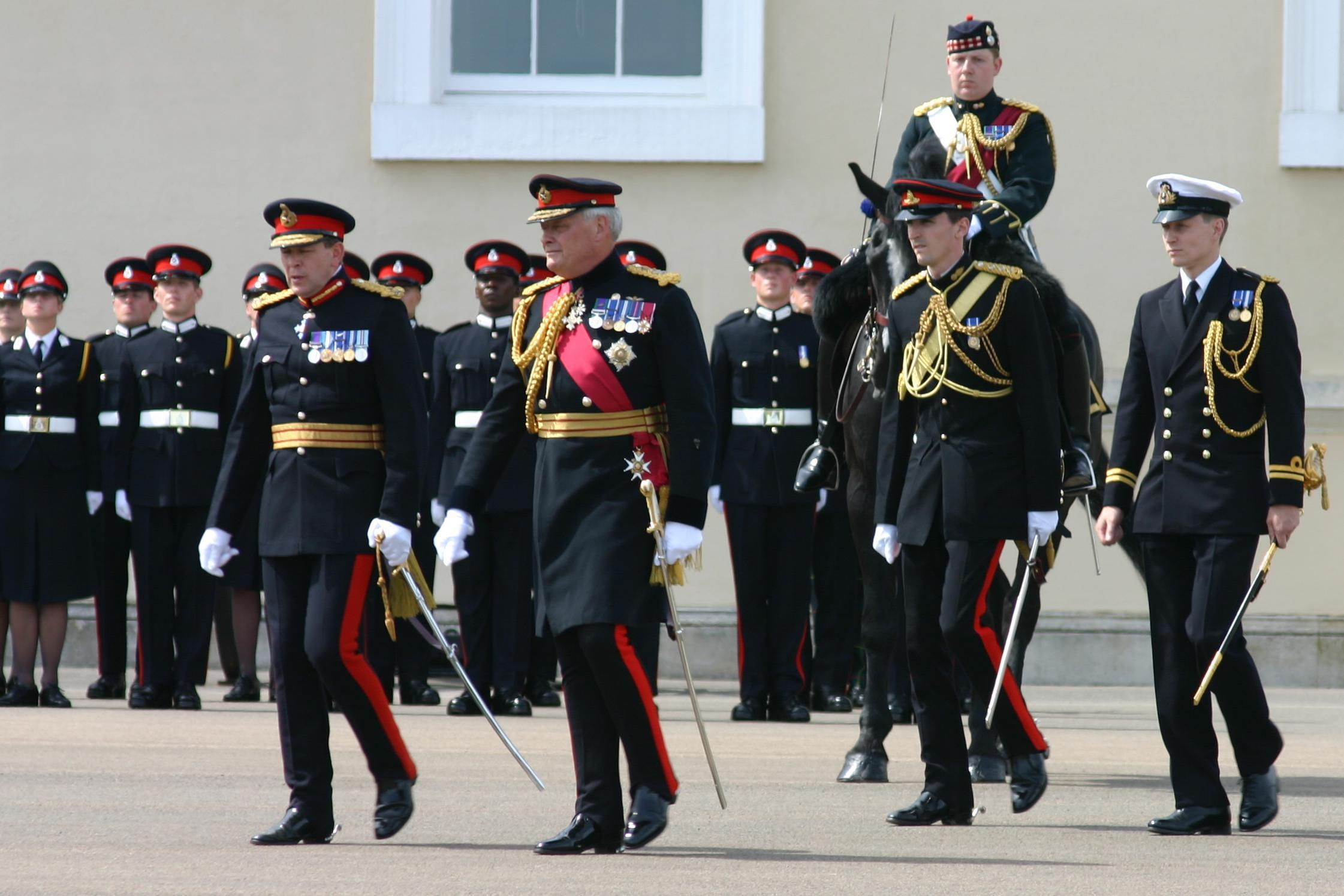
New colours are presented to RMAS, June 2005. Prince Harry (at attention, to left of horse) is on parade.

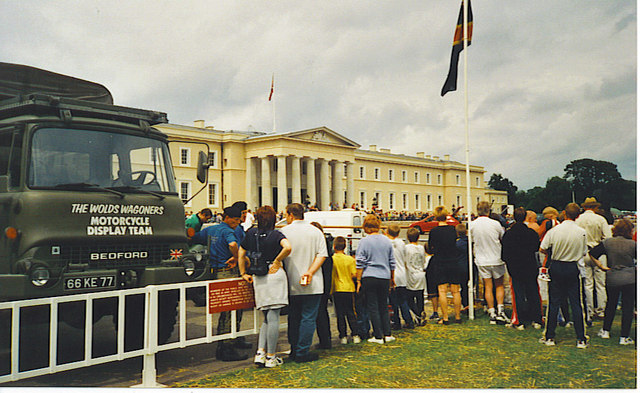
Open Day at the Royal Military Academy Sandhurst

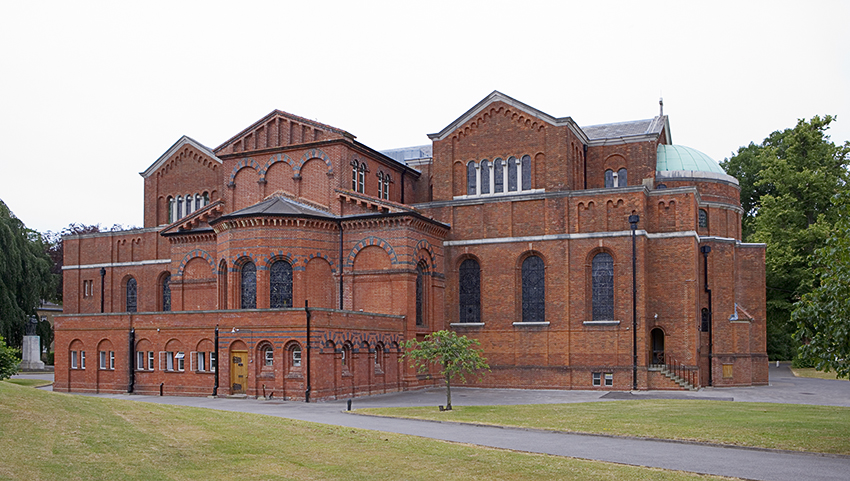
Royal Memorial Chapel south aspect

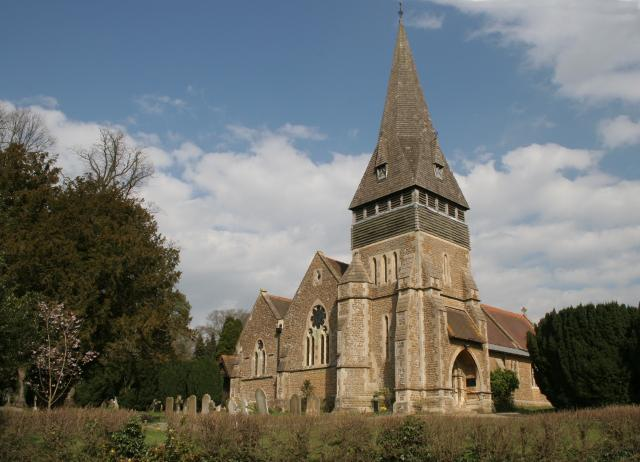
The Church of St Michael and All Angels

== Transport ==
Sandhurst lies just off the A30, which is 3.4 miles (5.5 km) away from junction 4 of the M3 motorway. It is also located 10 miles (16 km) from the M4, via the Crowthorne bypass (A3095) to Bracknell and the A329(M) towards Reading.

Sandhurst railway station is a stop on the North Downs Line; trains are operated by Great Western Railway. Services run between Gatwick, Guildford and Reading.

Stagecoach South operates bus route 3 between Yateley and Camberley every 15 minutes except on Sundays; alternate services extends to and from Aldershot.

== Local government ==
Sandhurst has representation through several tiers of government – town council, unitary authority, and parliamentary (UK). Its Town Council is divided into four wards, Central Sandhurst, Little Sandhurst, College Town and Owlsmoor, all represented by twenty-four councillors. It is also part of the Bracknell Forest District. The ancient parish of Sandhurst also covered Crowthorne, until this became an ecclesiastical parish in its own right in 1874 and a civil parish in 1894. The current mayor of Sandhurst is Councillor Parm Panesar.

== History ==
=== Saxon and Medieval periods ===
The name of the village is Anglo-Saxon and originates from the sandy soils and the hurst (a wooded eminence) of the area. In early 14th century records, Sandhurst appears as part of the township of Sonning, a large minster parish spreading over much of eastern Berkshire, which later became a hundred when its villages obtained their own churches. These lands belonged to the Bishops of Salisbury. There were two manors in Sandhurst: ‘Hall’ in the grounds of what is now the Royal Military Academy and ‘Sandhurst’ on the site of Sandhurst Lodge. Nothing remains of the original buildings. The first mention of the village of Sandhurst is to be found in the Exchequer Rolls of Henry II in 1175 where the receipt of one mark for the Villata de Sandhurst is recorded.

=== Tudor to Georgian periods ===
In the early modern era, Sandhurst parish was a small farming community on the very edge of Windsor Forest, Sandhurst Walke being an important forest division subject to forest laws. Locals had the right to cut turf, bracken, heather and wood that was primarily cultivated to feed the forest deer. These were hunted by Royal parties from a hunting lodge in the vicinity of Hart's Leap Road. A number of disputes are on record, showing how Sandhurst people sometimes took more resources than was allowed. Farming has always remained a major part of village life here and some defunct farms are still remembered in the names of housing estates, roads and even a restaurant: Sandhurst Farm, Snaprails, Caves Farm, Ambarrow Farm, College Farm, Rectory Farm, Beech Farm and Rackstraws Farm. In the mid-16th century, William, Lord Sandys, the Lord Chancellor to King Henry VIII, owned a supposed manor called 'Buckhurst' in the area between College Town and Central Sandhurst.

=== Victorian and Modern periods ===
Life changed very little in Sandhurst until the 19th century when large sections of land were sold for the building of the Royal Military College, which moved from Marlow in 1813. The railway arrived in 1849 and a number of large country residences were subsequently erected in the area: amongst them, Harts Leap, Forest End, St Helens, The Uplands, The Warren, Longdown Lodge, Ryefield, Snaprails, and Ambarrow Court. Sandhurst Lodge was erected in about 1858 by Robert W. Gibson and leased to John Walter, of the Times Newspaper, and then Sir William Farrer, solicitor to Queen Victoria and The Duke of Wellington. Perry Hill and The Ceders came later. Only a few remain today. The others have been demolished and land developed.

Such large houses and institutions, including the Broadmoor Hospital and Wellington College in nearby Crowthorne, led to a great expansion of the local population as people moved into the area looking for work. Further residential housing was erected for these workers, as well as more schools for their children, more places of worship and other community resources. Until Sandhurst Comprehensive – now Sandhurst School – was built in 1969 in Owlsmoor, Secondary-age pupils were sent to Edgbarrow School in Crowthorne, Forest Grammar School for boys in Winnersh or Holt School for girls in Wokingham. From the late 1950s to the 80s, large housing estates have been built creating the conglomerate town of today from the original four villages of College Town, Central Sandhurst, Little Sandhurst and Owlsmoor.

- St Michael's Parish Church, Little Sandhurst, dates from the 13th century, but was largely rebuilt in 1853.
- The Baptist Church, Central Sandhurst, was built in 1884.
- The Wesleyan Methodist chapel, Central Sandhurst, followed in 1906.
- The Church of England parish church of St George's Church | St George's Church | Owlsmoor, Owlsmoor, was built as an iron church in 1880 and was rebuilt in 1993.
- The Roman Catholic Church of the Immaculate Conception, Yorktown Road, was built in 1959.

St Michael's Church of England School, Little Sandhurst, was opened in 1862 and other schools followed in quick succession:

- Old Scotland Hill, Little Sandhurst, in 1871,
- The Methodist, Central Sandhurst, in 1906,
- College Town in 1907,
- Uplands, Central Sandhurst, in 1962 and
- Owlsmoor Primary was added in 1974.

== Recreation and sport ==
- The Tug of War Association National Outdoor Tug of War Championships were held in Sandhurst in the year 2000 and 2013.
- The Sandhurst tug of war team have been three times World champions, as seen on sign posts entering the town, next to Sandhurst Memorial Park.
- Sandhurst's football team, Sandhurst Town F.C., has its home ground at Bottom Meadow. It currently plays in the Combined County League Division 1.
- The boys and girls football club, offers football to all children aged 6 to 21 in the area and has over 750 registered players. The kit consists of the badge, the number in grey at the back and vertical red and white stripes which fade into white at the bottom. The shorts are black.
- Sandhurst Cricket Club field two teams in the Berkshire League with the 1st XI in the premier division. They also have a Sunday side and a Midweek XI, plus a growing junior section (U11s & U9s).
- Sandhurst Joggers has more than 400 members ranging from novices to athletes competing in a variety of local races, regional and National Championships and organises runs on 6 days of the week. It was founded in 1987.
- Sandhurst Memorial Park contains tennis and basketball courts, cricket and football pitches, a playground (with a large sand-play area) and a small skatepark. Pistachios in the Park is in the vicinity. The park has a large water area (called a balancing pond) where a firework show is held once a year, usually on the closest Saturday to Guy Fawkes Night and the Sandhurst Donkey Derby is also an annual event. The Memorial Park is home to Sandhurst Memorial parkrun, a weekly 5k run held in the United Kingdom. It is held every Saturday at 9.00am and takes in a route that includes the River Blackwater and Shepherd Meadows.
- Sandhurst Leisure Centre is in the Owlsmoor area. It is facilitated by Sandhurst School and has various facilities for sporting and recreational activities.
- Sandhurst has an active Historical Society.
- Sandhurst Silver Band Organisation rehearse in their own facility in the town and maintain two separate bands - The Sandhurst Community Band and the Sandhurst Silver Band. In March 2018, Sandhurst Silver Band became London and Southern Counties First Section Champions, earning an invitation to the National Finals in September 2018.

== Notable people ==
- William, Prince of Wales (then Prince William of Wales) resided at the Royal Military Academy between January and December 2006.
- Greg Davies, the actor and comedian, was an English & Drama teacher at Sandhurst School in the 1990s.
- Max and Harvey, twin musicians and social media stars.
- John Sands, born in Sandhurst, emigrated to Australia and founded John Sands printing company.
- Dinky Diamond, drummer of Sparks died in his house here.

== Sources ==
- PH Ditchfield (1923), The Victoria County History of Berkshire.
