= Edgbarrow School =

Location
- Grant Road; Crowthorne, Berkshire, RG45 7HZ; England; 51.3629°N 0.7938°W

Information
- Type: Academy
- Established: 14 September 1959
- Local authority: Bracknell
- Department for Education URN: 145244 Tables
- Ofsted: Reports
- Head teacher: Stuart Matthews
- Gender: Co-educational
- Age: 11 to 18
- Enrolment: 1540 total
- Progress 8 score (GCSE): 0.53
- Website: Official website

Edgbarrow School is a secondary Academy School in Crowthorne, Berkshire, England. The school is the main state secondary school in the area, and includes Edgbarrow Sixth Form College. It previously held the title of a Business and Enterprise College as a specialist school.

The school has approximately 1410 pupils, most of whom come from Crowthorne schools, such as Wildmoor Heath School and Oaklands School, Hatch Ride school and Crowthorne C of E school . The school teaches 11- to 18-year-olds, and has some of the best results in Bracknell Forest at GCSE of any non-selective state schools.

== School site ==
The school is on the boundary of Wildmoor Heath Nature Reserve. It has two large grass playing fields and one astro-turf pitch. The sports centre, managed by Bracknell Forest Council until 2017, is used by the school for PE lessons taking advantage of their sports hall and dance studio.

The School has seven main buildings:

- The Elsey Building, opened in 2021, to replace the previous Main block. Contains classrooms for Maths, English, Languages and Art.
- The Hill block, which has student support, progress department.
- The Humanities block, teaching geography, history, ICT, religious studies and housing the library
- The Science block
- The Administration block, consisting of the central office, conferencing facilities and reprographics (photocopier)
- The Sports Centre, which has a 1 main sports hall which is used for sports including basketball, dodgeball and volleyball and a smaller sports hall for yoga and circuits. There are also a dance studio, a fitness suite and outside there are 7 tennis courts, an astroturf and 2 main fields.
- The Sixth form centre, of which features ground source heating, bat friendly lighting and solar power.

The administration block was built in 2003, whilst the main body of the school was constructed throughout the previous forty years. Prior to the construction of the new admin block, reception was located in a small room near the main hall.

== Sixth Form Centre ==
The Old Edgbarrow Sixth Form Centre (Now Hill Block)

Over 300 students study at the school sixth form. The Sixth Form students differ from the school's pupils in that they wear no uniform.

The sixth form and business studies building was opened in September 2010 in order to allow for the ever-increasing student population, replacing the previous facility, now known as the hill block. The new sixth form building features a quiet study area, a cafeteria, surrounding classrooms, and a large communal atrium where students can socialise. The atrium is also used for assemblies and school events.
