= Sandhurst to Owlsmoor Bogs and Heaths =

Protected area in Berkshire, England

- Site of Special Scientific Interest
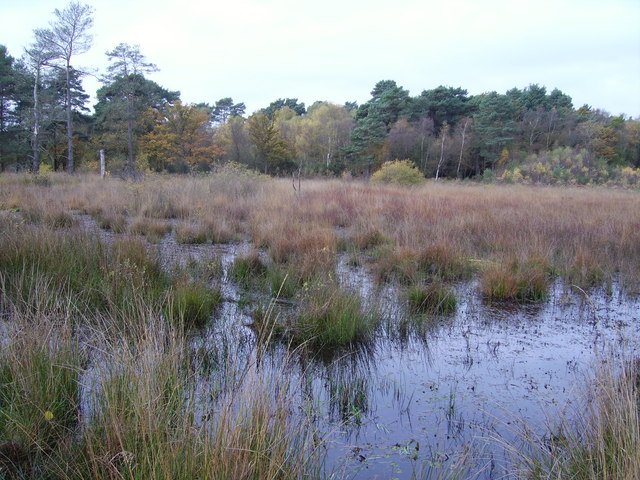

- Location within Berkshire
- Location of Sandhurst to Owlsmoor Bogs and Heaths.
- Area of search: Berkshire
- Grid reference: SU 843 628
- Coordinates: 51.357°N 0.789°W
- Interest: Biological
- Area: 85.8 hectares (212 acres)
- Notification date: 1983
- Location map: Magic Map

Sandhurst to Owlsmoor Bogs and Heaths is an 85.8-hectare (212-acre) biological Site of Special Scientific Interest (SSSI) on the northern outskirts of Sandhurst in Berkshire. Part of the SSSI is Wildmoor Heath nature reserve, which is managed by the Berkshire, Buckinghamshire and Oxfordshire Wildlife Trust. and the SSSI is part of Thames Basin Heaths Special Protection Area.

== Geography ==
Wildmoor Heath is situated on a slope and features wet and dry lowland heath and valley bog, plus pine and broadleaved woodland.

== History ==
In 1975 the site was designated a site of special scientific interest (SSSI). Wildmoor Heath nature reserve was formed in 1998 by combining land at Edgbarrow Woods, Owlsmoor Bog, and Wildmoor Bottom.

== Fauna ==
The site has the following animals:

=== Mammals ===
- Red fox
- Roe deer
- Dexter cattle

=== Reptiles and amphibians ===
- Vipera berus
- Grass snake
- Anguis fragilis
- Viviparous lizard

=== Birds ===
- Common chiffchaff
- Great spotted woodpecker
- European green woodpecker
- European nightjar
- Common snipe
- European stonechat
- Willow warbler
- Dartford warbler
- Woodlark
- Eurasian bullfinch
- Eurasian hobby
- Common kingfisher

=== Invertebrates ===
- Hairy dragonfly
- Common hawker
- Golden-ringed dragonfly
- Libellula depressa
- Keeled skimmer
- Beautiful demoiselle
- Banded demoiselle
- Lestes sponsa
- Erythromma najas
- Large red damselfly
- Blue-tailed damselfly
- Enallagma cyathigerum
- Azure damselfly
- Southern hawker
- Brown hawker
- Migrant hawker
- Emperor dragonfly
- Downy emerald
- Brilliant emerald
- Black-tailed skimmer
- Four-spotted chaser
- Sympetrum danae
- Ruddy darter
- Common darter
- Silver-studded blue
- Stag beetle
- Raft spider
- bog bush cricket
- Saturniinae
- Argiope bruennichi

== Flora ==
The site has the following flora:

=== Trees ===
- Birch
- Pine
- Fraxinus
- Maple
- Quercus robur
- Malus sylvestris
- Sorbus torminalis

=== Plants ===
- Erica tetralix
- Molinia caerulea
- Drosera rotundifolia
- Drosera intermedia
- Rhynchospora alba
- Carex pulicaris
- Narthecium ossifragum
- Pinguicula vulgaris
- Calluna
- Eriophorum angustifolium
- Succisa pratensis
- Scutellaria minor
- Hypericum elodes
- Lychnis flos-cuculi
- Succisa pratensis
