= Bracknell Forest =

District in Berkshire, England

- Unitary authority, borough
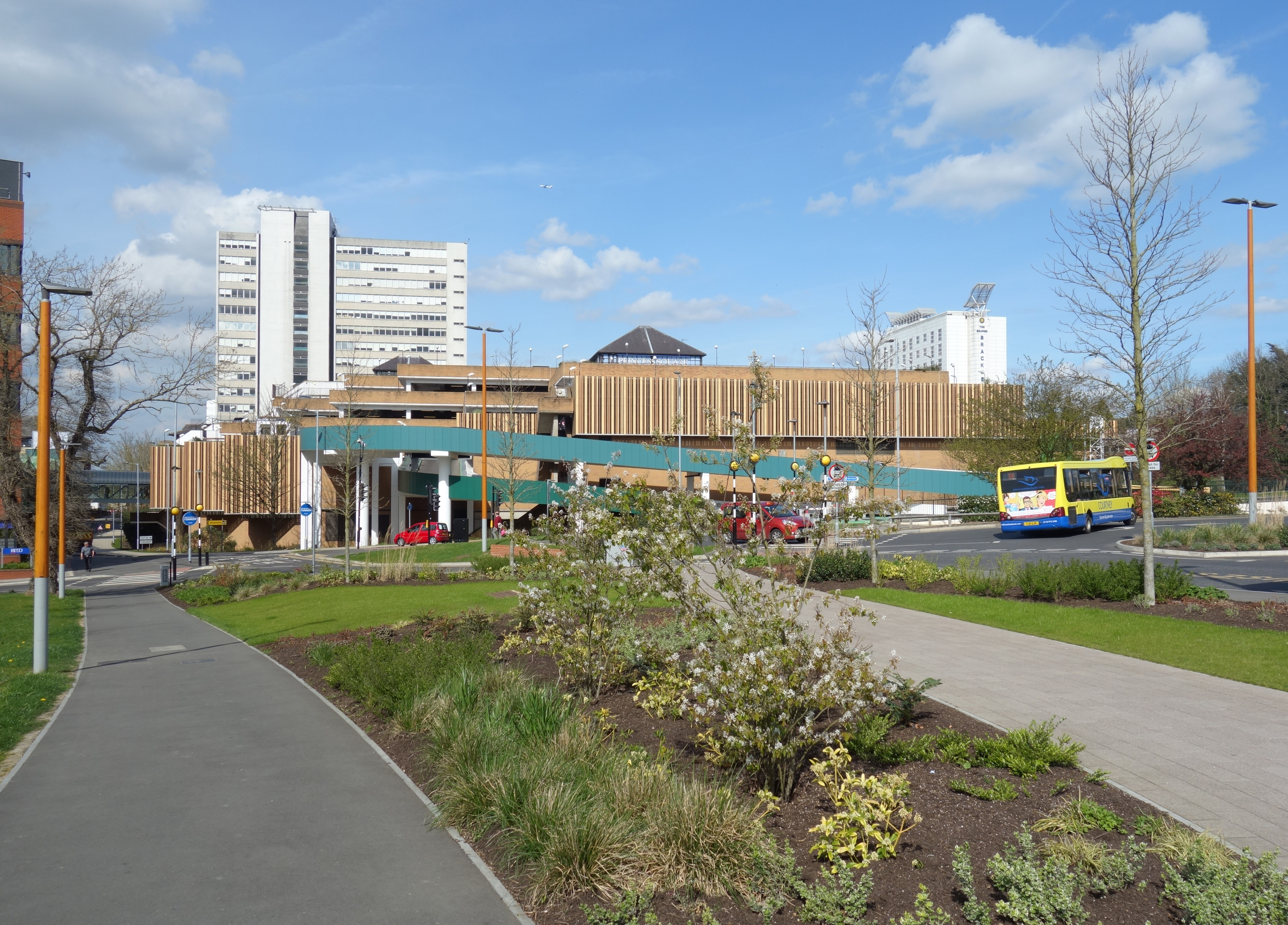
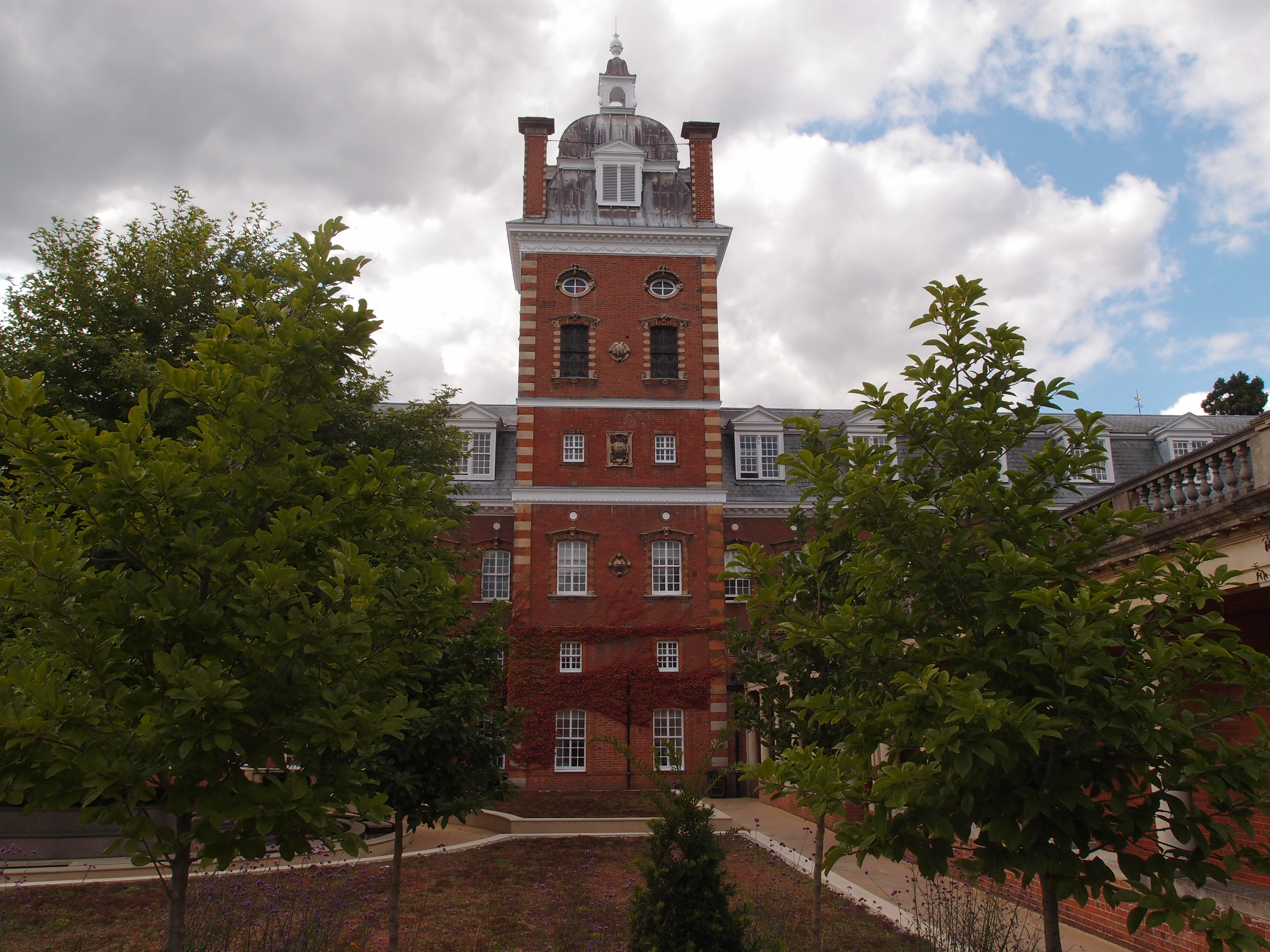
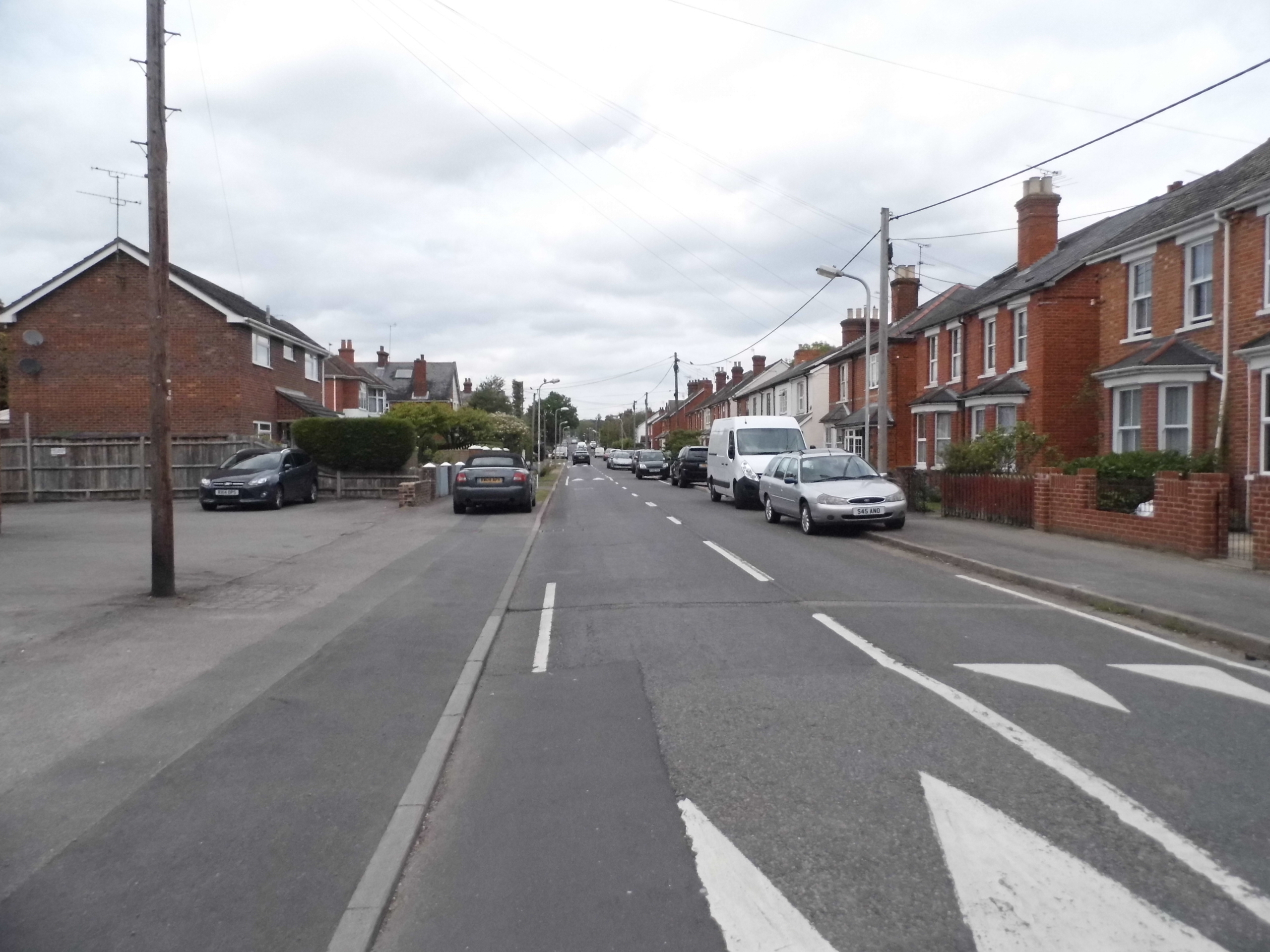
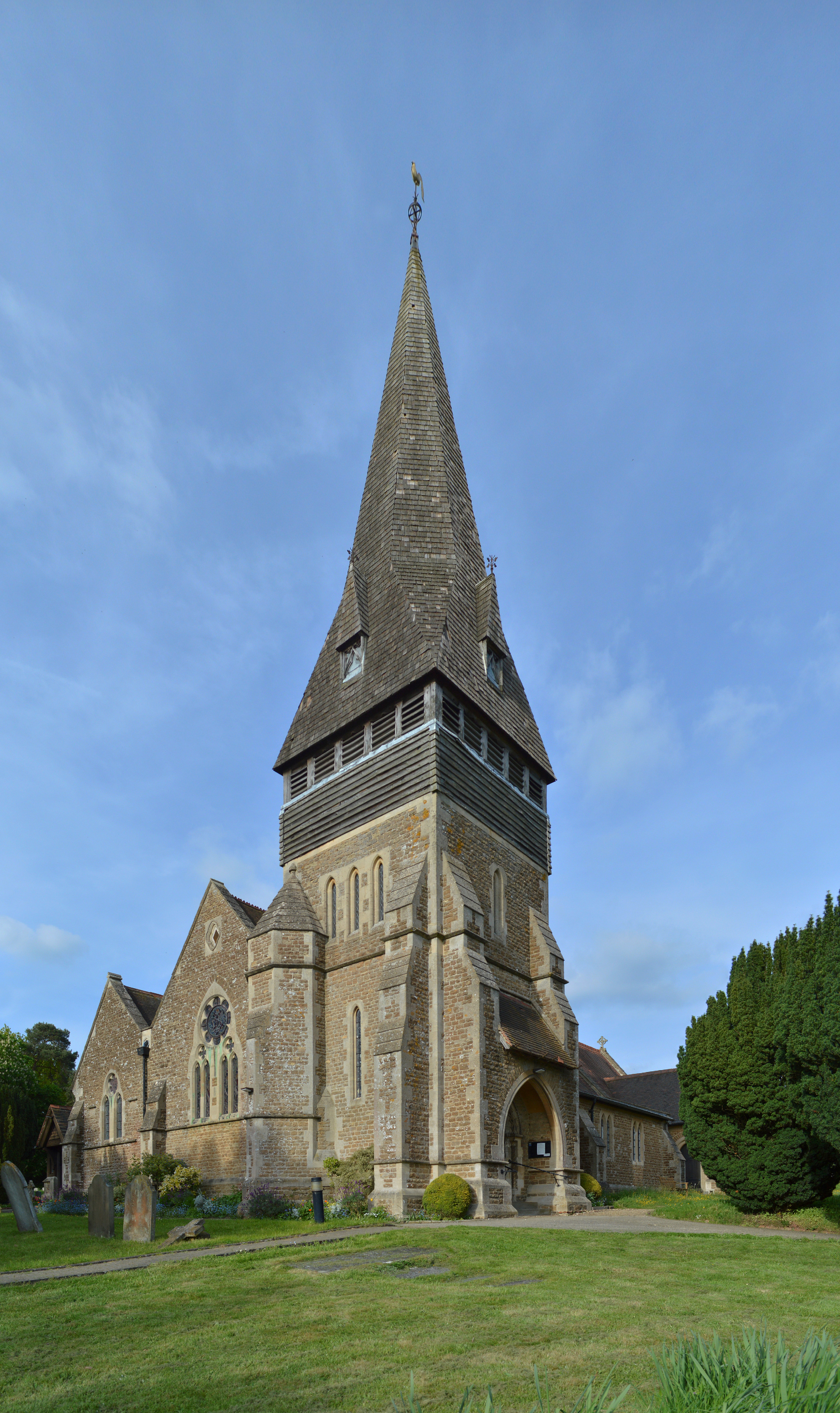
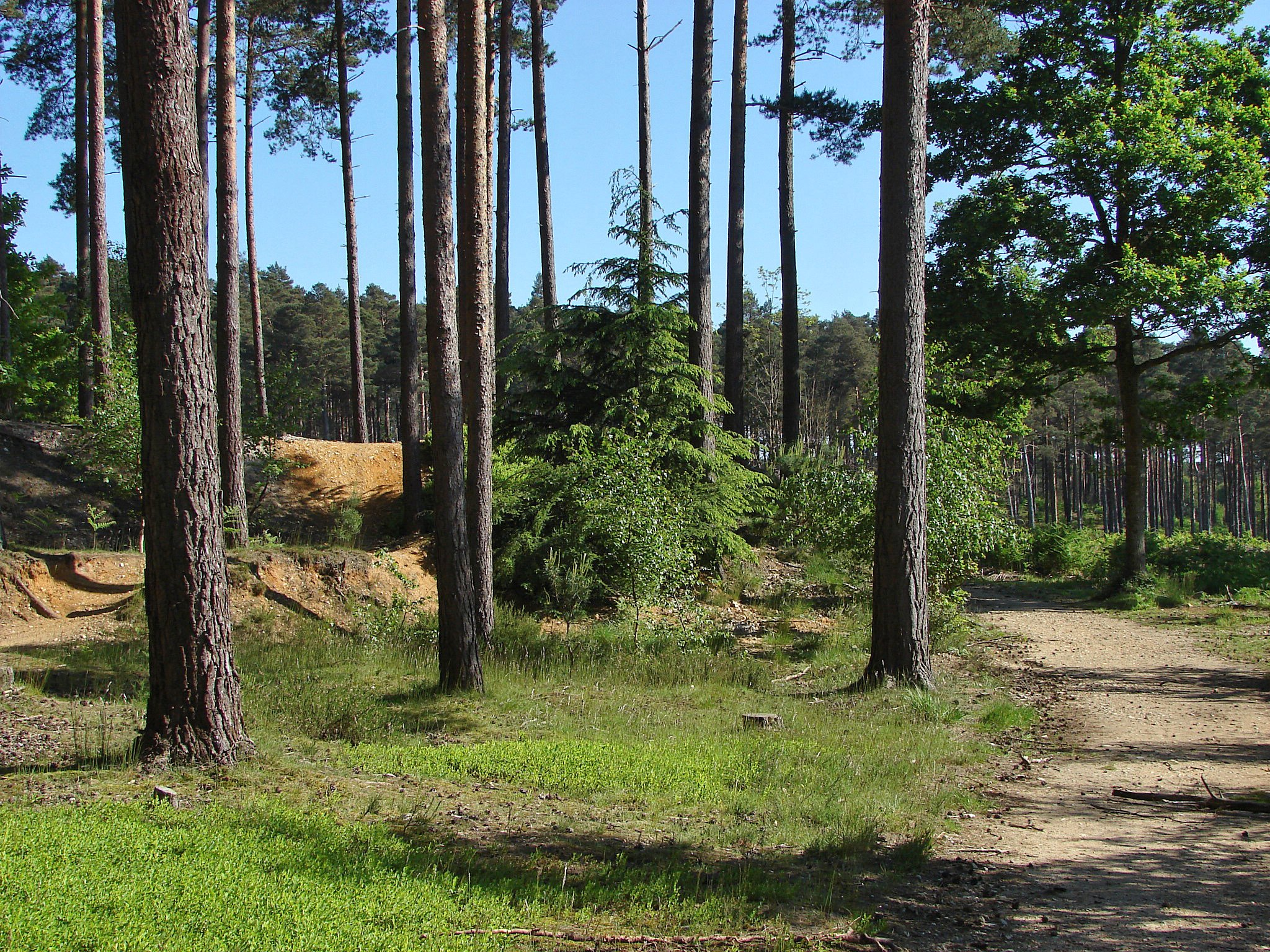
- From left to right; Top: Bracknell town skyline; Middle: Wellington College in Crowthorne and College Road, College Town; Bottom: St Michael's Church in Sandhurst and Swinley Forest

- Shown within Berkshire
- Coordinates: 51°25′01″N 0°44′49″W
- Sovereign state: United Kingdom
- Constituent country: England
- Region: South East England
- Ceremonial Counties: Berkshire
- Status: Unitary authority
- Incorporated: 1 April 1974
- Admin HQ: Bracknell

Government
  - Type: Unitary authority
  - Body: Bracknell Forest Borough Council
  - Leadership: Leader & Cabinet (Labour)
  - MPs: Peter Swallow (Lab); Joshua Reynolds (Lib Dem)

Area
  - Total: 42.23 sq mi (109.38 km^{2})
  - Rank: 191st (of 296)

Population (2025)
  - Total: 132,145
  - Rank: 184th (of 296)
  - Density: 3,129.0/sq mi (1,208.1/km^{2})

Ethnicity (2021 census)
  - Ethnic groups: List: 86.1% White; 7.1% Asian; 3.1% Mixed; 2.4% Black; 1.3% other

Religion (2021)
  - Religion: List: 47.5% Christianity; 40.4% no religion; 10.3% other; 1.8% Islam
- Time zone: UTC0 (GMT)
  - Summer (DST): UTC+1 (BST)
- ONS code: 00MA (ONS) E06000036 (GSS)
- OS grid reference: SU871694
- ISO 3166-2: GB-BRC
- Website: www.bracknell-forest.gov.uk

Bracknell Forest is a borough with unitary status in Berkshire, England, centred on the two towns of Bracknell and Sandhurst. It also includes the villages of Crowthorne and also includes the areas of North Ascot, Binfield, Warfield, and Winkfield. The borough borders the Berkshire boroughs of Wokingham and the Royal Borough of Windsor and Maidenhead, and also parts of Surrey and Hampshire.

== History ==
The district was formed as Easthampstead Rural District under the Local Government Act 1894 as a successor to the Easthampstead rural sanitary district. Originally a small rural district, its population was about 20,000 during World War II. Bracknell, in the district, was one of the first post-war new towns to be designated, and became a civil parish in 1955, created from parts of Binfield, Easthampstead, Warfield and Winkfield parishes. Bracknell had originally been a hamlet at the far south-west of Warfield parish.

The district's population rose rapidly, and reached 64,135 by the 1971 census. In 1974 the district was reconstituted as the non-metropolitan district of Bracknell under the Local Government Act 1972. It changed its name in May 1988 to Bracknell Forest, at the same time as it was granted borough status.

On 1 April 1998, Berkshire County Council was abolished, as a consequence of the Banham Review, and Bracknell Forest Borough Council became a unitary authority. From 2008, references to 'borough' were phased out in favour of simply Bracknell Forest Council.

Since 1973, Bracknell town has been twinned with Opladen in Germany, continued by Leverkusen after Opladen's incorporation in 1975.

There are 265 Listed Buildings in the borough of which 254 are Grade II, 10 are Grade II* and 1 is Grade I.

There are five sites in the borough included on the Register of Historic Parks and Gardens: Ascot Place, Broadmoor Hospital, Newbold College, South Hill Park and Windsor Great Park.

Bracknell Forest Borough Council's offices at Time Square in Market Street were featured in an episode of Road Wars on 4 February 2010 when a pursuit ended in the carpark.

== Geography ==
Two rivers run through Bracknell Forest: the River Blackwater forms the borough's southern boundary, and the Cut meanders through the northern parishes. These receive water from small streams within the borough namely the Bull Brook in the north which feeds into the Cut and the Wish stream which flows into the River Blackwater. The built and developed proportion of the Borough amounts to about 35% of the total land area. Extensive forests cover more than 20% of the total area, consisting principally of parts of Windsor Forest; predominantly conifer plantation owned and managed by the Crown Estate and Forestry Commission. Agricultural land covers 24% of the land, located mainly in the north of the borough.

More than 20% of the borough is recognised as being of a high wildlife value and protected by some form of designation. Nine sites in Bracknell Forest are designated as Site of Special Scientific Interest (SSSI), comprising 1911.5 hectares or 17.48% of the Borough's total area. The largest, Broadmoor to Bagshot Woods & Heaths SSSI was designated in 2001 to include the majority of Swinley Forest.

The Thames Basin Heaths Special Protection Area (SPA), 1356 hectares of which lie within Bracknell Forest (Sandhurst to Owlsmoor Bogs and Heaths SSSI and the Broadmoor to Bagshot Woods and Heaths SSSI), supports nationally important populations of Dartford warblers, nightjars and woodlarks, all of which are Annex I species of the Birds Directive, and a small breeding population of hobbies, an important migratory species in a European context.

== Demographics ==
Bracknell Forest is generally affluent (ranked 291 out of 326 on the Index of Multiple Deprivation 2010, Rank of Average Score) with significantly lower than average unemployment levels. Property prices and levels of car ownership are significantly higher than the national average. However deprivation does exist in the borough -central Bracknell is within the 30% most deprived areas in England, with several other parts of the town also within the more deprived half of England. In contrast, almost all of Crowthorne, Sandhurst, and the borough's rural fringes fall into the 10% least deprived areas in England. Household incomes are also significantly lower than other areas of similar deprivation, being close to the national average.

According to the Office for National Statistics figures the borough's population is 113,696. 77% of the borough's population, aged between 16 and 74 years are economically active with the service sector employing the largest proportion, 46.4% of this group. Only 11% of the population is of pensionable age, compared to a national average of 18%, with 7% being over 75 years old.

There are many distinctive local geographical communities within Bracknell Forest, from Sandhurst and Crowthorne in the south, the semi-rural communities of Binfield, Winkfield and Warfield in the north and the former new town of Bracknell in the centre, which contains most of the Borough's commercial and industrial areas.

With respect to ethnicity, according to the Office for National Statistics, the vast majority of the Borough's residents (89.6%) consider themselves to be 'White'. The second largest group is defined as 'Asian' at 4.34%, third as 'Black' at 2.35%, fourth as Mixed at 1.82%. With regard to religious affiliation, the population is predominantly Christian (77.8%), followed by those who have no religion (19.4%), Hindus (1.1%), Muslims (0.7%), Buddhists (0.3%), other religions (0.3%), Jews (0.2%) and Sikhs (0.2%).

The population has a life expectancy at 80.15 years.

== Industry ==
Bracknell Forest is a base for high-tech industries and home to companies such as Panasonic, Fujitsu (formerly ICL) and Fujitsu Siemens Computers, Dell, Hewlett-Packard, Sharp Corporation, Tracks Laser & Electronics and LSI Corporation. The software development and computer services side of the industry also thrives in Bracknell Forest and includes companies like Cable and Wireless, Honeywell, Avnet, Novell, and RSA Security. Pharmaceutical and engineering companies also draw together in Bracknell Forest, these include Boehringer Ingelheim, Syngenta, Minebea, Daler-Rowney and Hyundai Heavy Industries.

Bracknell is also home to the central Waitrose distribution centre and head office which is on a 70-acre (280,000 m^{2}) site on the Southern Industrial Estate. Waitrose has operated from the town since the 1970s. The town is also home to the headquarters of Avis Europe.

== Swinley Forest ==
There is no forest called 'Bracknell Forest'. This name is often confused with Swinley Forest (or Woods), which is an area of the Windsor Estate between Bracknell and Bagshot. Owned and managed by the Crown Estates, it comprises 2,600 acres (11 km^{2}) of woodland (mainly Scots pine). It is a Site of Special Scientific Interest (SSSI), and has protected areas for the birds that live there.

It also provides some of the best mountain biking in South-East England, with many off-road 'single-track' trails available as well as plenty of fire roads. In recent years, Swinley forest has also been used as a filming location for a number of films including Harry Potter and the Deathly Hallows Parts 1 & 2.

== Civil parishes ==
- Binfield
- Bracknell
- Crowthorne
- Sandhurst
- Warfield
- Winkfield
