= Ermin Way =

Roman road that ran from Silchester to Gloucester, England

Coordinates: 51.6274°N 1.8199°W

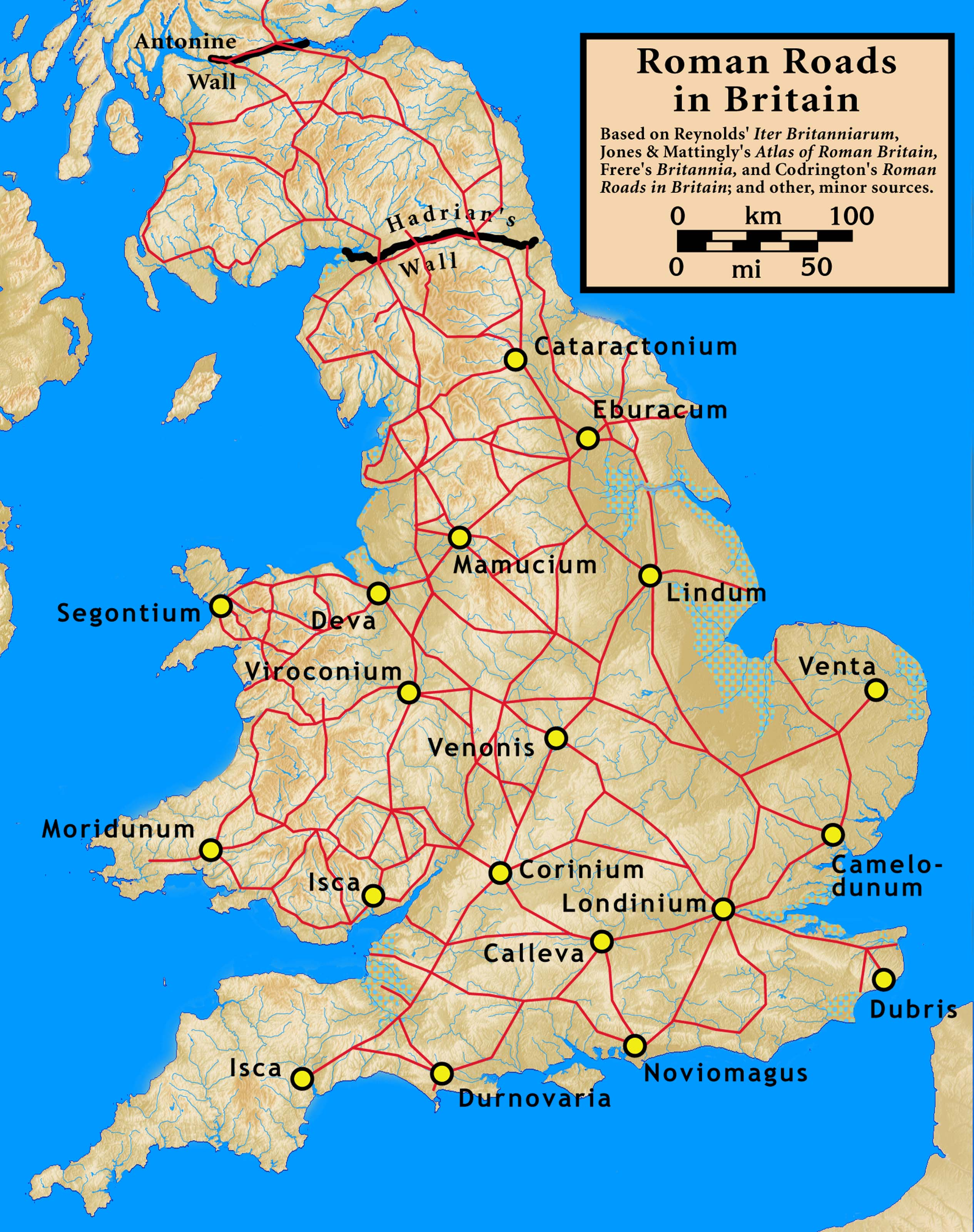
A map of the Roman roads in Britain, showing Calleva and Corinum, two towns on Ermin Way.

Ermin Street or Ermin Way was a Roman road in Britain. It linked Glevum (Gloucester) and Corinium (Cirencester) to Calleva (Silchester).

At Glevum it connected to the road to Isca (Caerleon), the legionary base in southeast Wales. At Corinium it connected to the Fosse Way between Isca (Exeter) and Lindum (Lincoln). At Calleva it connected to the Devil's Highway to Londinium (London) and the Kentish ports, as well as to other routes to points in the southwest.

The road has been assigned the Margary number 41. Much of its route is now covered by the modern A417, A419 and B4000 roads.

In 2024, a previously unknown Roman town between Gloucester and Cirencester was uncovered during construction work on the A417.

== See also ==
- Roman roads in Britain
