= Broadmoor to Bagshot Woods and Heaths =

Protected area in Berkshire and Surrey, England

- Site of Special Scientific Interest
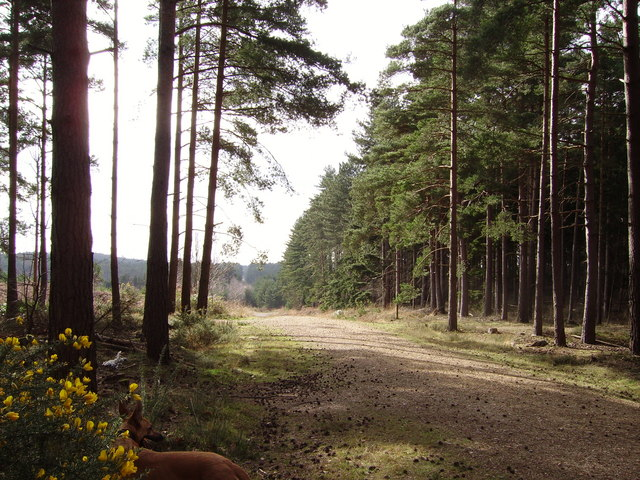
- Track through Swinley Forest

- Location within Berkshire
- Location of Broadmoor to Bagshot Woods and Heaths.
- Area of search: Berkshire; Surrey
- Grid reference: SU 877 640
- Coordinates: 51.37190°N 0.74147°W
- Interest: Biological
- Area: 1,696.3 hectares (4,192 acres)
- Notification date: 2000
- Location map: Magic Map

Broadmoor to Bagshot Woods and Heaths is a 1,696.3-hectare (4,192-acre) biological Site of Special Scientific Interest (SSSI) in Berkshire and Surrey that extend from a minority of the parish of Crowthorne including around Broadmoor Hospital in the west to Bagshot south-east, Bracknell north-east, and Sandhurst, south. It is part of the Thames Basin Heaths Special Protection Area. Two nature reserves which are managed by the Surrey Wildlife Trust are in the SSSI, Barossa nature reserve and Poors Allotment. Broadmoor Bottom, which is part of Wildmoor Heath, also falls within the SSSI; this reserve is managed by the Berkshire, Buckinghamshire and Oxfordshire Wildlife Trust.

== Environment ==
This area has an extensive mosaic of broadleaved woodland, coniferous plantation, dry and wet heathland, valley mire, a series of base-poor ponds and a scarce breeding invertebrate assemblage (topsoil and plants). In particular, the heathland and coniferous plantation supports internationally important populations of woodlark, Eurasian nightjar and Dartford warbler, and have a nationally important dragonfly and damselfly population. The site includes the peatland valley bogs of Broadmoor Bottom and Wishmoor Bottom which form the most important remaining examples of this type of habitat in the region. The site encloses a variety of habitats, but especially some open heathland as well as forestry plantations. The underlying geology includes recent deposits such as the Barton sands, part of the Bagshot Formation with local gravel deposits. They form a well-drained subsoil, so the area is mainly dry. Pockets of clay near the surface result in relatively shallow, sheltered pools.

== Adjoining forest and military use ==
The area is partly used by Royal Military Academy, Sandhurst and is partially within Swinley Forest, the main woodland of Bracknell Forest district.

== Bird life ==
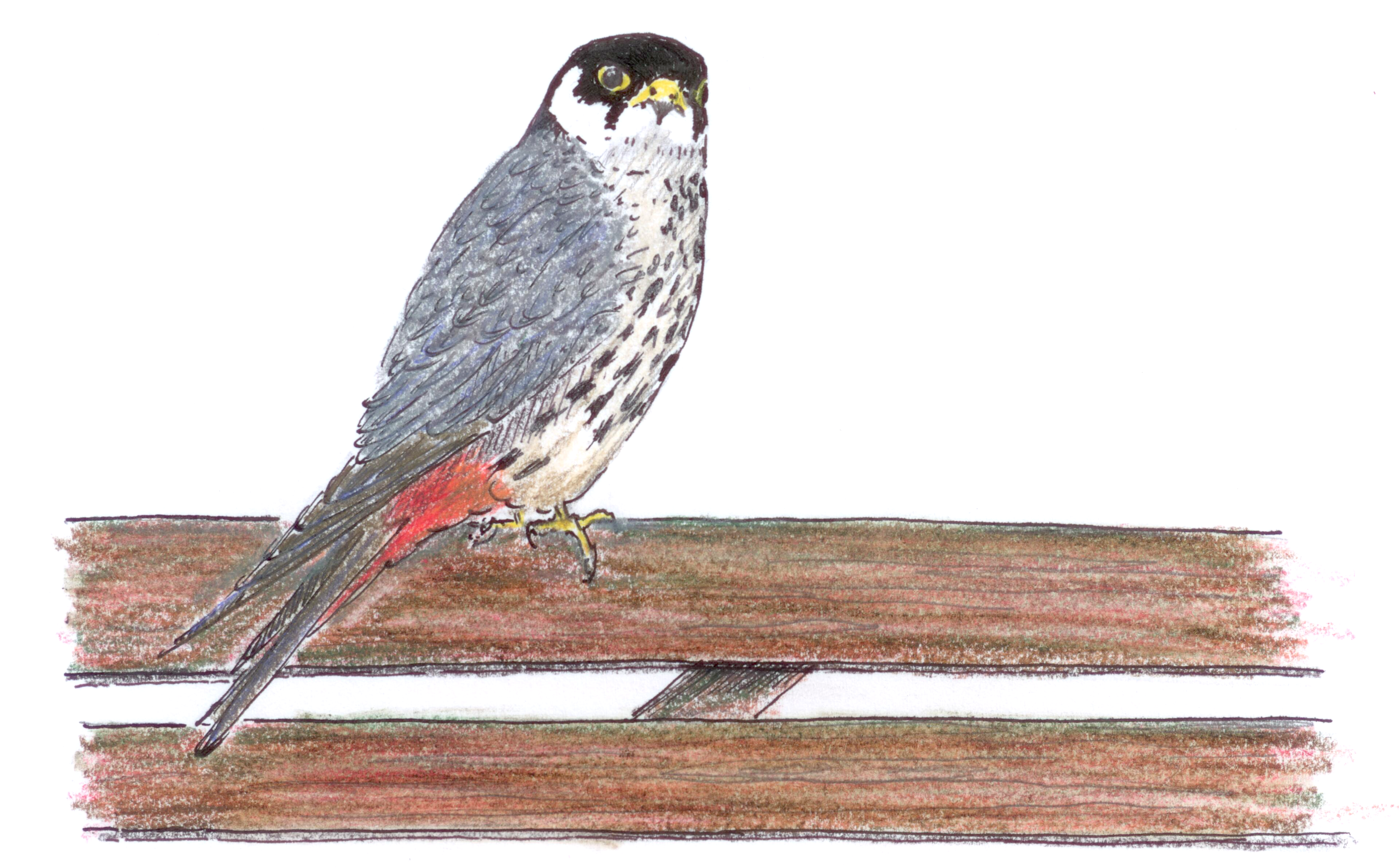
The Hobby, a drawing by Jos Zwarts

The mixture of open heathland, some valley bottom bogs and woodland provides habitats for heathland birds including the European stonechat Saxicola rubicola, common redstart Phoenicurus phoenicurus, and three particularly vulnerable species of bird, woodlark Lullula arborea, nightjar Caprimulgus europaeus and Dartford warbler Sylvia undata. The site also has a small breeding population of the hobby Falco subbuteo. Forestry management of the coniferous woodland, which includes rotational clearance and subsequent replanting, provides temporary areas of developing heathland. These areas, together with open storm damaged areas and the developing heathland alongside broad forest rides, are utilised as breeding habitat by woodlark, the Hobby (bird) and nightjar. They have expanded as Sitka spruce plantations have been cut down, such as in and around Caesar's Camp.

== Archaeology ==
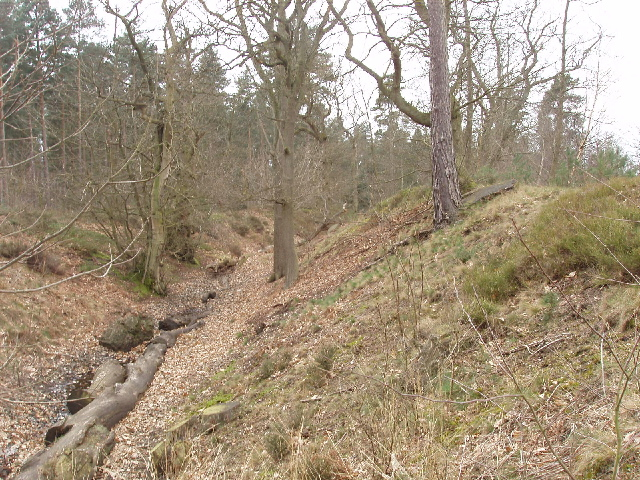
Bank and ditch at Caesar's Camp

One feature of note within the area is an Iron Age hill fort called Caesar's Camp. It is one of the largest hillforts in the south of England, but has not been excavated systematically. Some of the coniferous woodland has been cleared from the site, enabling greater visibility of the massive earthworks of the ramparts. It has produced a few Iron Age coins. An important Roman road, the Devil's Highway (Roman Britain) also cuts across the woods and heathland from east to west, leading to the Roman town of Calleva Atrebatum. It is also linked to the Iron Age fort by a short road which cuts through a small Roman settlement known as Wickham Bushes. The site has produced random scatters of pottery, tiles, nails and brick, as well as Samian ware, suggesting it may have been a staging post on the road, but again, has never been excavated scientifically. There are also numerous redoubts made by soldiers practicing engineering skills during the Napoleonic Wars.

== See also ==
- Swinley Forest
- Thames Basin Heaths
