= Nine Mile Ride =

Coordinates: 51.382°N 0.812°W

Nine Mile Ride is a length of the B3430 road in the English county of Berkshire, running from the south of Bracknell to Finchampstead, in the Borough of Wokingham. Despite its name, the road is 6.7 miles (10.8 km) long. The western end is close to the California Country Park in California, Berkshire.

== History ==
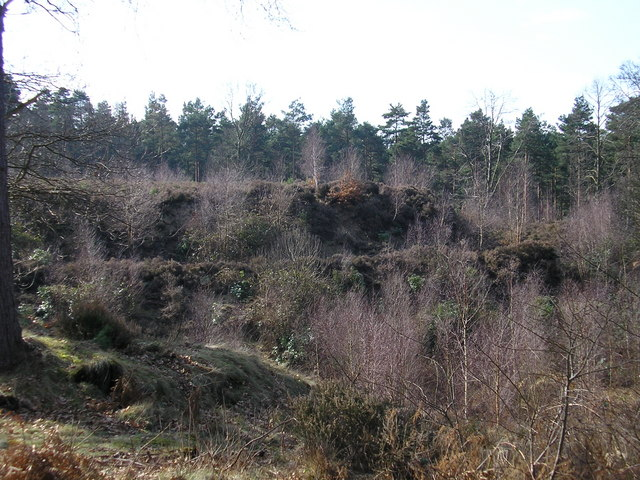
Multivallate defences at Caesar's Camp

Despite its straight length, the Nine Mile Ride is not a former Roman road. It was built for King George III as part of an expansion programme to the rides built for Queen Anne to more easily facilitate hunting in Windsor Forest. It begins at the site of Swinley Lodge, the home of the Royal Buckhounds.

Nine Mile Ride runs almost parallel with the Roman road known as the Devil's Highway, which was between Londinium and Calleva Atrebatum (Silchester). However, the projected course of the Roman road is to the south of Nine Mile Ride and runs at a higher elevation through less populous areas. It also passes the large Iron Age hillfort at its eastern end known as Caesar's Camp in Bracknell Forest.

== Route ==
Nine Mile Ride connects several residential areas in east Berkshire. Nine Mile Ride is largely suburban in character, and includes a small selection of shops, pubs and restaurants. In recent years, a number of the older properties along the road have been either renovated and extended, or replaced. The former public house, 'Who'd a Thought It?' featured in the 1954 film, Bang! You're Dead; the building was demolished in 2003.

== Extension ==
In May 2021 an extension of the Nine Mile Ride began construction by Balfour Beatty, to be named Nine Mile Ride Extension (NMRE). The NMRE connects the existing A327 Eversley Road in the north with the Nine Mile Ride / Park Lane junction in the south.

The extension consists of an additional 1.23 miles, making the entire route including the original Nine Mile Ride 7.93 miles. This makes the route still short of its namesake's nine miles, however there is land available west of the new roundabout with the A327 which could allow for further development and therefore additional future extension of the NMRE.

The NMRE was constructed in 2 sections with the addition of 4 new roundabouts; a northern section between A327 Eversley Road and the lane next to Hogwood Industrial Estate, along with a southern section which is planned to provide connections for new homes as part of the Arborfield Green housing project by Wokingham Council. NMRE fully opened in Summer 2022 with a 30 mph speed limit along its whole length. As a result of its completion the old access lane linking the A327 from the south to Arborfield Garrison (now closed and renamed to Arborfield Green), named Sheerlands Road, was separated into two sections; a northern and a southern section.

The majority of the route is residential in nature, with efforts being made in road design to slow traffic by having minimal straight sections. This is significantly more prevalent in the northern section which connects to the A327.

The route runs past several new housing estates enabled by the construction of the NMRE, which were built by Legal & General, Crest Nicholson and Redrow plc, along with Bohunt School and a Sainsbury's supermarket opened in late 2025.
