= Swinley Forest =

Woodland in Southern England

Coordinates: 51°22′N 0°44′W

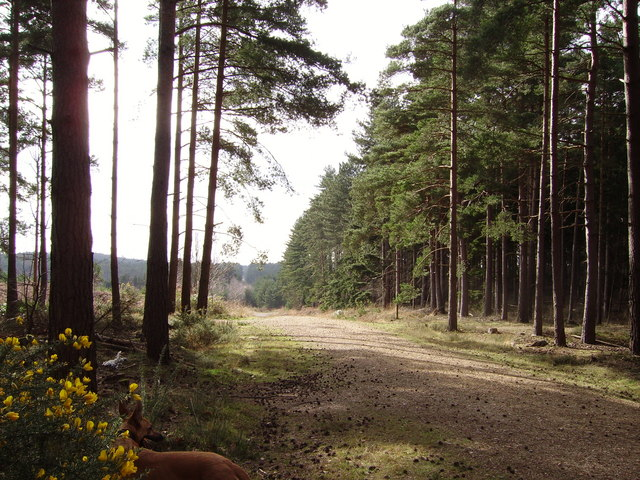
Track through Swinley Forest

Swinley Forest is a large expanse of Crown Estate woodland managed by Forestry England mainly within the civil parishes of Windlesham in Surrey and Winkfield and Crowthorne in Berkshire, England.

== Coverage ==
Situated to the south-west of Windsor Great Park, the forest stretches from Bracknell, in the north, to Bagshot, in the south. It is owned and managed by the Crown Estate and comprises over 2,600 acres (11 km^{2}) of woodland across gently undulating hills. Although now mostly a modern plantation of Scots Pines, the area was once part of Windsor Forest. Swinley Forest includes Crowthorne Woods around Caesar's Camp between the Nine Mile Ride and Crowthorne; Swinley Park between Forest Park and the B3017; Bagshot Heath just west of Bagshot; and Swinley Woods around Kings Ride between the B3017 and South Ascot. Much of the woods cover what used to be moorland as indicated by the names of some of the hills, such as Broadmoor, Owlsmoor, Wishmoor, Gormoor, Whitmoor and Englemoor (now Englemere).

== History ==
Swinley Park once surrounded Swinley Lodge where the King kept the Royal Staghounds in Georgian times. It was at the centre of Swinley Walke, one of the sub-divisions of Windsor Forest.

In the 18th century Daniel Defoe - writing in the fashion of the time of regarding uncultivated land as wild and forbidding - described Bagshot Heath as

"a vast tract of land [...] which is not only poor, but even quite steril [sic], given up to barrenness, horrid and frightful to look on [...] much of it is a sandy desert [...] This sand indeed is checked by the heath, or heather, which grows in it [...] but the ground is otherwise so poor and barren that the product of it feeds no creatures, but some very small sheep, who feed chiefly on the said heather [...] nor are there any villages, worth mentioning, and but few houses or people for many miles far and wide".

There are a number of late 18th century redoubts scattered throughout the forest. These defensive earth fortifications were built here not as working defences but as training grounds to carry out military exercises in the buildup to the Napoleonic Wars.

In May 2011 forest fires broke out throughout the forest; the cause is believed to be a mixture of the unseasonably dry conditions and arson. Although the fires were stated at the time by the Royal Berkshire Fire and Rescue Service to have been the most extensive fires ever tackled by the service, the extent of the damage to the forest was relatively limited.

== Leisure and attractions ==
=== Mountain biking ===
The woods provide some of the best mountain biking in South-East England, with many off-road 'single-track' trails available as well as plenty of fire roads. Mountain biking no longer requires a permit since the introduction of the three marked trails (Green, Blue and Red) and walking is free. Swinley Woods was originally submitted as the proposed venue for the mountain biking event of the 2012 Summer Olympics, however, the distance from the main Olympic Park was considered too great and the heavy forestation along most of the suggested routes would have resulted in poor camera access and views. The event was instead located at Hadleigh Farm near Hadleigh, Essex.

=== Visitor centre ===
At Gormoor on the Nine Mile Ride, on the northern edge of Crowthorne Woods, is The Look Out Discovery Centre, operated by Bracknell Forest Borough Council. This is a hands-on science exhibition and nature discovery centre, which also acts as a visitor centre for the forest, providing maps, car parking and bike hire. Most of the self-guided walks and bike trails start and end at the centre.

=== Caesar's Camp ===
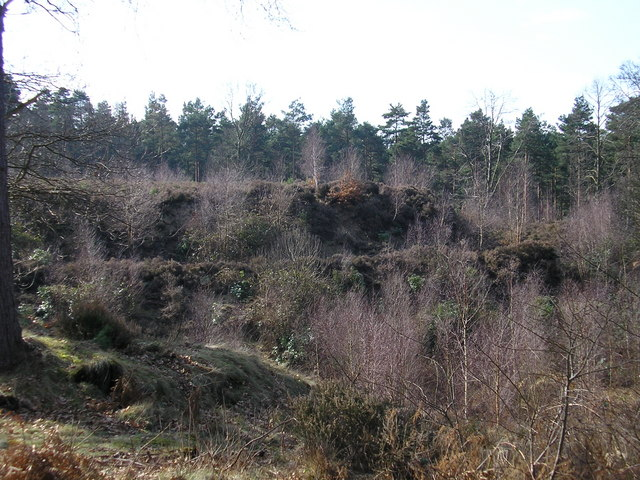
Multivallate defences at Caesar's Camp

Adjoining the Look Out is an Iron Age hill fort known as Caesar's Camp. It is the only one in East Berkshire. It has not been excavated but Iron Age coins have been found there. The name only dates from the 18th century. Caesar's Camp appears to have fallen under the rule of Cunobelin, king of the Catuvellauni tribe in the first century AD from a coin discovered in the interior. Soon after, the Romans invaded England; after this time, there is no evidence that Caesar's Camp continued to exist as an inhabited community. A road from its south entrance was later built, connecting it to the Devil's Highway (Roman Britain). There is a small Roman settlement about halfway along this road, known as Wickham Bushes, which has yielded pottery and other Roman artifacts.

A redoubt roughly 40 m across in the fort is thought to be part of a defence line built in 1792 in preparation for the Napoleonic Wars.

=== Go Ape ===
In 2007, a Go Ape facility was opened to the public, featuring a series of tree-top rope bridges and climbs.

== Protection status ==
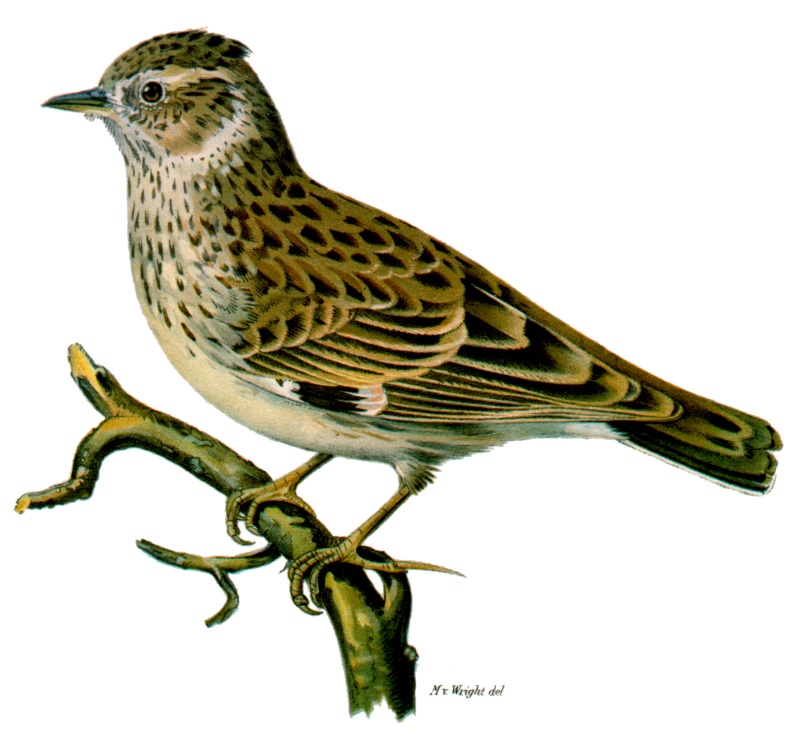
Lithograph of a woodlark by Magnus von Wright

Swinley Park and Brick Pits is a Site of Special Scientific Interest (SSSI) and has protected areas for the birds that live there. Some parts of Swinley Forest are also covered by the Broadmoor to Bagshot Woods and Heaths SSI, one of the largest SSIs in Berkshire. As well as the extensive commercial conifer plantations and mixed woodland the nationally rare lowland heath present means Swinley Forest forms part of the Thames Basin Heaths, a designated Special Protection Area (SPA), due to the rare ground nesting birds including wood lark, Dartford warbler and European nightjar which nest in open parts of the forest. The area also includes some marshy areas where reptiles and marshland plants such as cotton grass are common.

== In popular culture ==
=== Film ===
In June 2009 and February 2010, filming for Harry Potter and the Deathly Hallows – Part 1 occurred in Swinley Forest. It also featured in Harry Potter and the Order of the Phoenix. Scenes from the James Bond film No Time To Die were shot here over 12 days in 2019.

=== Television ===
Scenes from the 2005 episode "Sauce for the Goose" from Midsommer Murders were shot in Swinley Forest. A significant part of the forest was cut down for a castle set for the Lord of the Rings: The Rings of Power.
