= Atrebatum =

Atrebatum can refer to the following places:

- Calleva Atrebatum, modern Silchester
- Atrebatum, ancient Roman name of Arras, in northern France
