= Silchester Ogham stone =

Pillar stone

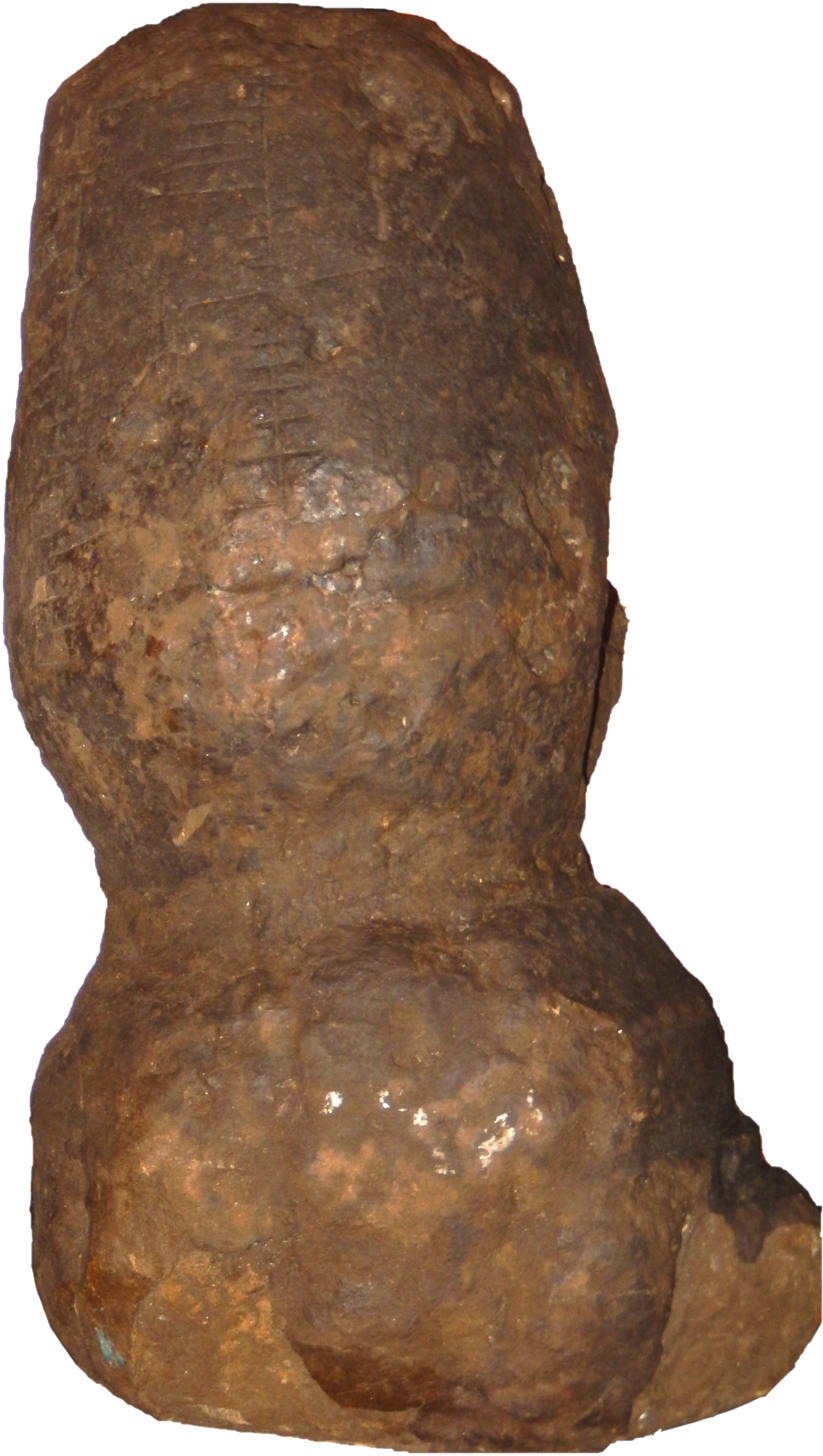
The Silchester Ogham stone

The Silchester Ogham stone is a pillar stone discovered at the Roman town on Calleva Atrebatum in Silchester, Hampshire during excavations in 1893. Thus far it remains the only one of its kind found in England, and the only ogham inscription in England east of Cornwall and Devon. The stone is held in a storage facility of Reading Museum in Reading, Berkshire.

== Background ==
The pillar stone was found upside down some five to six feet beneath the surface, apparently at the bottom of a former well. A white metal or pewter vessel "of peculiar form" lay underneath, crushed by it. Further investigation revealed an ogham inscription upon the pillar. According to Amanda Clarke and Michael Fulford of the University of Reading,

The significance of the find as an isolated example of ogham some distance from the main British distribution in Devon and Cornwall and west of the River Severn was certainly appreciated at the time of the discovery. The stone and its inscription were reported on separately from the account of the excavation itself by Sir John Rhys in the year of the discovery. His reading, EBICATO[S]/[MAQ]I MUCO[I--], 'of Ebicatus, son of the tribe of', has been accepted up to now.

Rhys noted that the sandstone marker was "rudely carved into what seems to me to be a phallic form", though the upper part was broken off and missing. What was left "may be described as the frustum of a cone, below which the stone narrows greatly, then widens into a moulded base." The inscription is in two lines beginning at the widest part of the frustum at its base.

== Dating ==
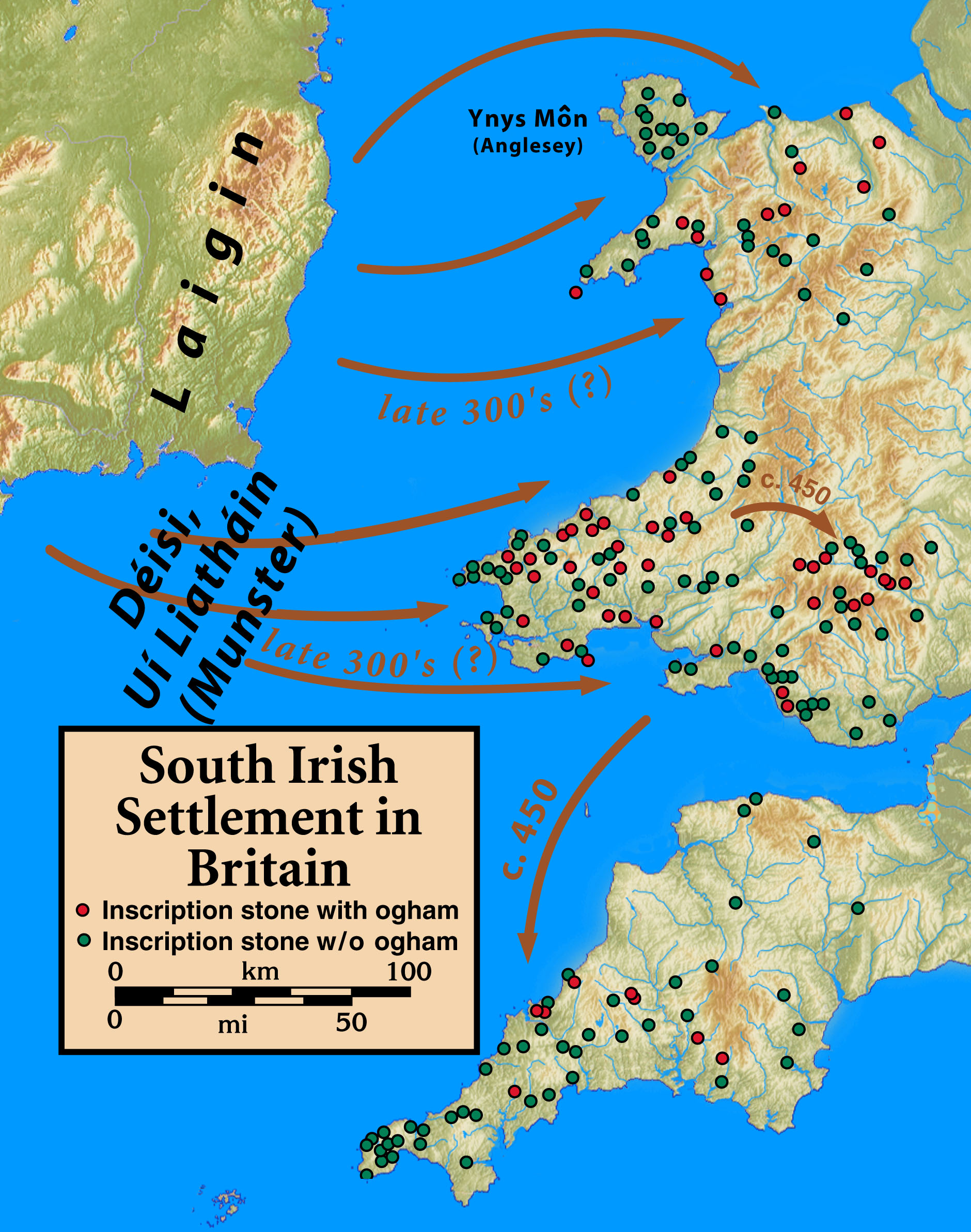
Map of Irish migration to Britain

The pewter vessel, when reconstructed, turned out to be "a simple, biconical flagon similar to a few other examples found in southern Britain which can be dated broadly to the fourth and no earlier than the late third century." The most recent version of the translation on the stone is "[The something] of Tebicatus, son of the tribe of N”. The missing word may be "memorial" or, less probably, "land", if the stone were a territorial marker rather than a grave marker. J. A. Baird argues that both archaeological and linguistic evidence suggest that the stone belongs to "the earliest phases of the ogham script", which emerges with contact between late Roman Latin and Old Irish.

On the basis of existing evidence, Reading University says that the "inscription has been interpreted as an epitaph and it has been variously dated to the fifth and sixth centuries". Baird says that it "could well date to the late fourth or fifth century". This would make it "one of the earliest ogham stones anywhere."

== Significance ==
The inscription was created during Sub-Roman Britain, a period of intense cross-cultural contact between Britain and Ireland at the time of the Anglo-Saxon invasions. Most ogham inscriptions are present in the British strongholds of Cornwall, Devon and Wales. The Silchester inscription is in Hampshire — east of Devon — and is presumed to be the work of Irish settlers occupying land further east than other known Irish migrants. The tradition of the expulsion of the Déisi and their migration from Ireland may be related to this pattern of settlement and British-Irish cultural integration.

== 3D scan ==
The ogham stone was 3D scanned in 2022. It is accessible on Sketchfab.

== See also ==
- List of individual rocks
