= Finchampstead =

Village in Berkshire, England

Coordinates: 51.361°N 0.860°W

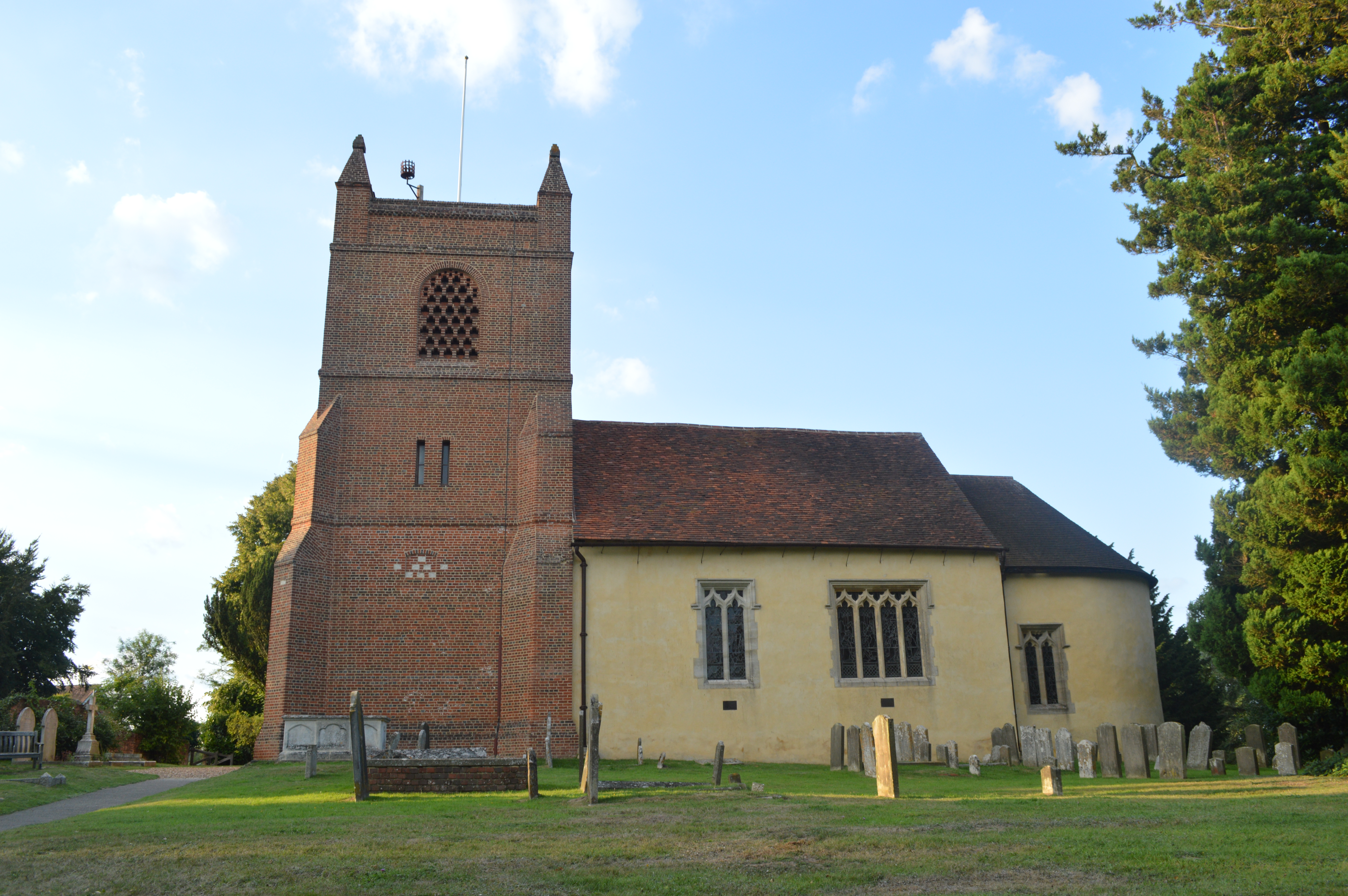
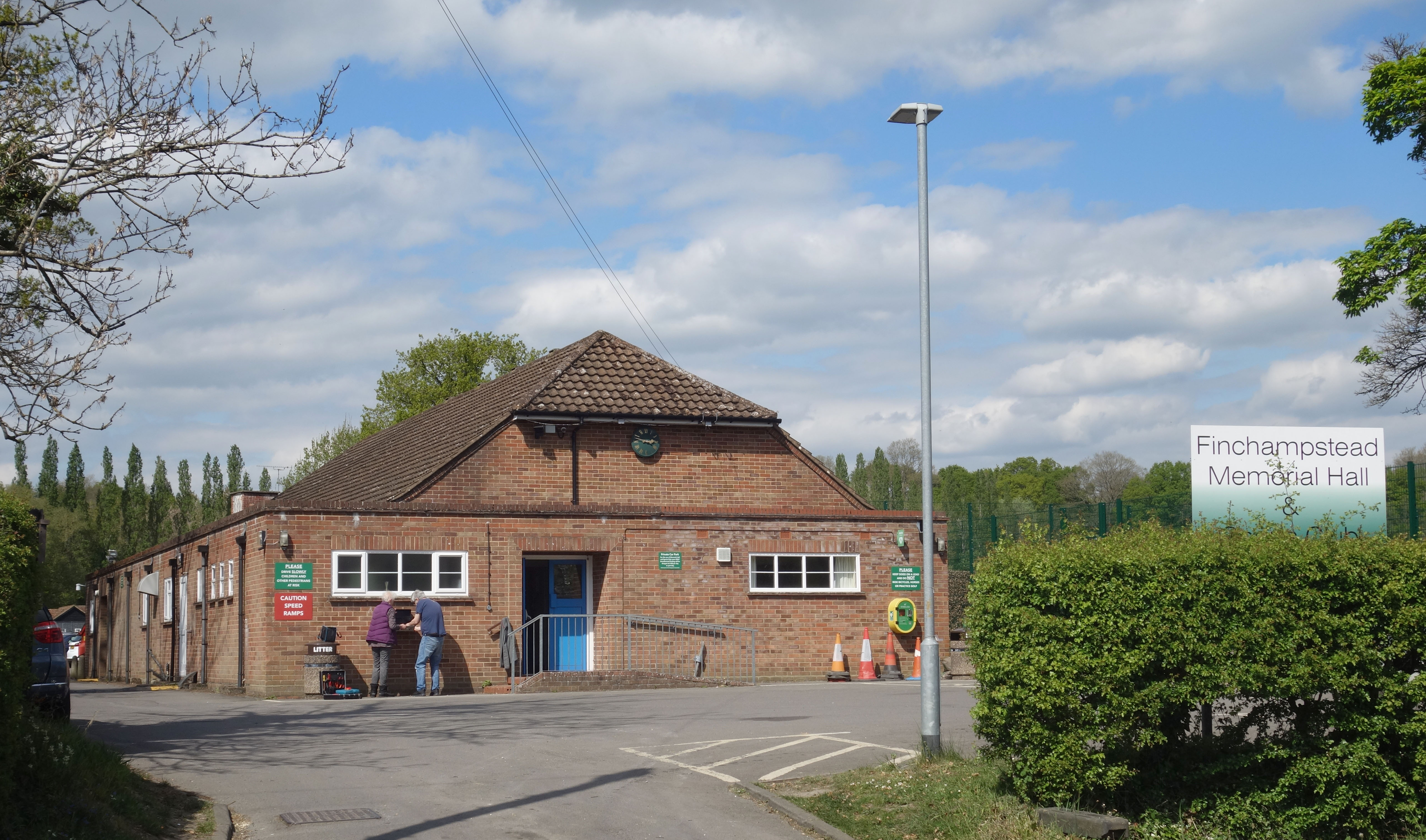
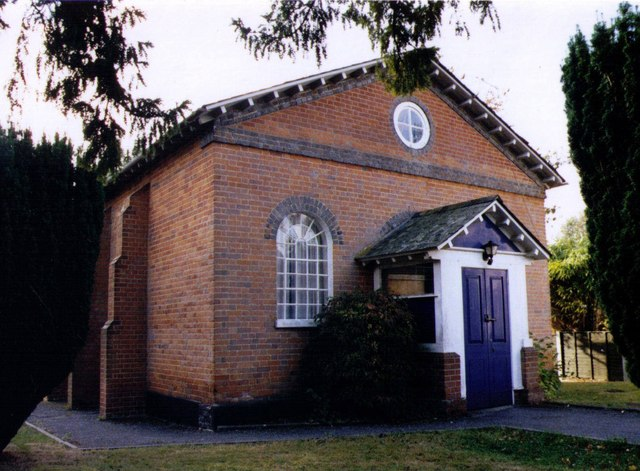
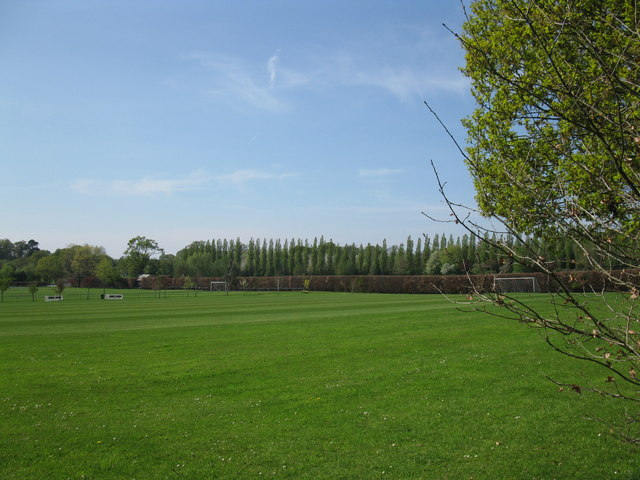
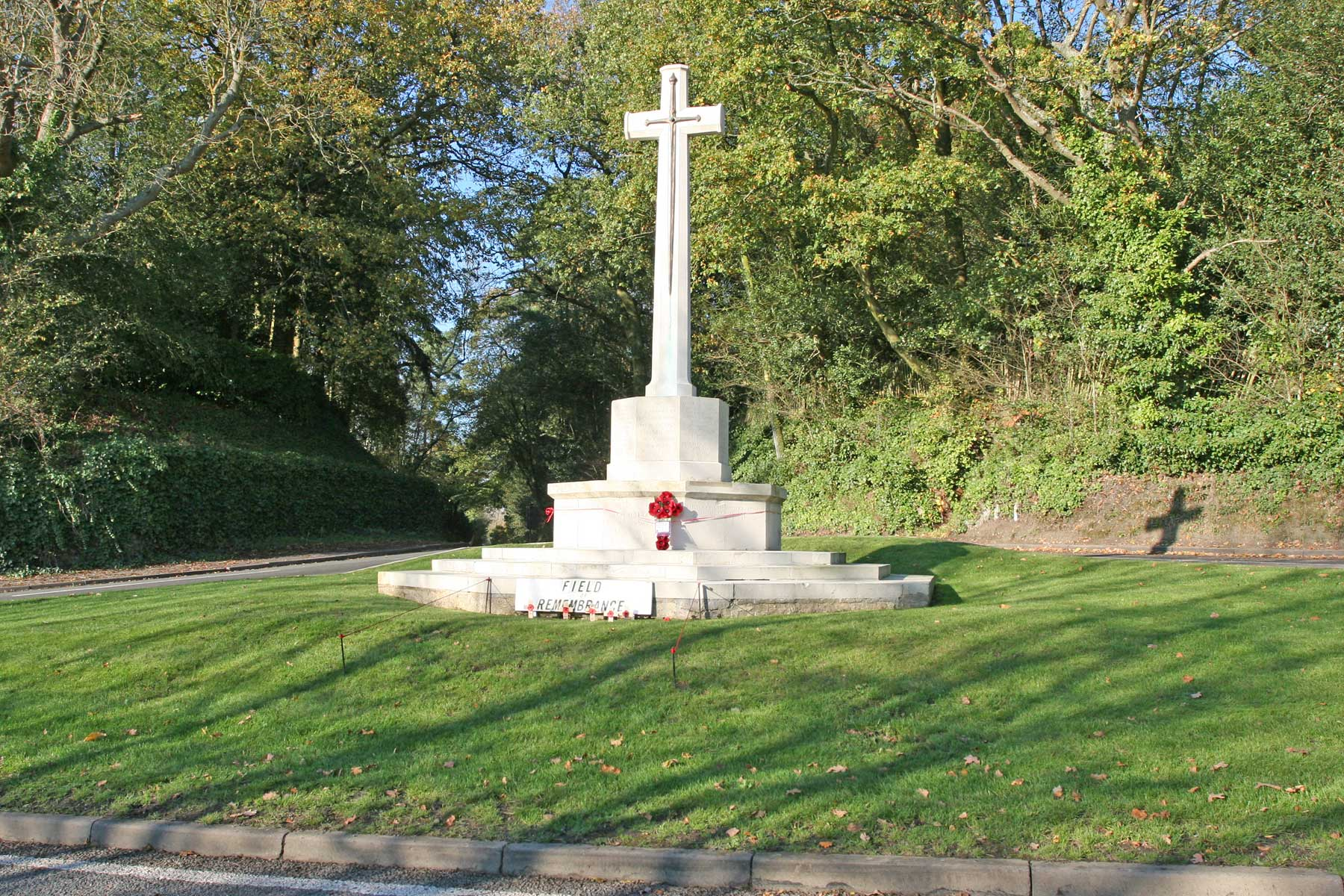
- St James' parish church Memorial Hall Baptist chapel Memorial Ground The war memorial

- Location within Berkshire
- Population: 12,751 (2021 census)
- OS grid reference: SU7964
- Civil parish: Finchampstead
- Unitary authority: Wokingham
- Ceremonial county: Berkshire
- Region: South East
- Country: England
- Sovereign state: United Kingdom
- Post town: Wokingham
- Postcode district: RG40
- Dialling code: 0118
- Police: Thames Valley
- Fire: Royal Berkshire
- Ambulance: South Central
- UK Parliament: Wokingham
- Website: Finchampstead Parish Council

Finchampstead is a village and civil parish in Wokingham Borough in Berkshire, England. Bordering northeastern Hampshire to the south, its northern extremity is 2 miles (3 km) south of Wokingham, 5 miles (8 km) west of Bracknell, 8 miles (13 km) south-east of Reading, and 34 miles (55 km) west of central London. It is an affluent area, with the village ranking as Britain's 31st wealthiest. It has a high standard of living and is rated as one of the most desirable places to live in the United Kingdom.

== History ==
The Church of England parish church of St James is on top of a prominent hill and has an old Roman earthwork around it. It was probably the site of a pagan temple. The Roman road between London and Silchester, called the "Devil's Highway", ran through the middle of the parish. A Roman milestone survives at Banisters. Finchampstead's Old English toponym derives from the large variety of finches that still populate the area. It is referred to by the younger generation as 'Finch'. Oswald of Northumbria apparently visited the village in the 7th century and named the local holy well, which is recorded in the Anglo-Saxon Chronicle to have flowed with blood in times of National crisis.

Finchampstead is a richly wooded area on the western edge of old Windsor Forest and once the centre of one of its divisional "walkes" and bailiwicks. It was the hunting place of Royalty and an old tale tells how King Henry VII brought his son, Prince Arthur, out onto the Ridges to see his bride, Catherine of Aragon, for the first time. His other son, Henry VIII, is said to have wooed two sisters at East Court Manor until one committed suicide in a fit of jealousy. There are three manor houses. East Court was next to the church, but has been replaced by a Victorian building and the name has been transferred to another house in the village. West Court is a 17th and 19th century house at Finchampstead Lea. Banisters, on the lower slopes of Fleet Hill, is a brick Restoration house of 1683. Finchampstead's Wellingtonia Avenue was planted with one hundred giant sequoia trees, as a monument to the 1st Duke of Wellington in the 1860s. Wellington College school nearby was also erected in his memory.

== Governance ==
Finchampstead has a parish council with 17 councillors elected by the North, South and Lower Wokingham wards. The parish is in Wokingham Borough, a unitary authority.

== Geography ==
Finchampstead parish extends from The Throat on the southern edge of Wokingham, just past the Inchcape Garage, down to the Tally Ho pub on the River Blackwater which forms the southern border with Eversley and its county Hampshire, over Eversley Bridge. Finchampstead Bridge is further east, just above Eversley Cross. To the east of the parish is Sandhurst and to the west are Swallowfield, Arborfield and Barkham. The Roman road from London to Silchester traverses the parish from West Court through to Roman Ride off the A321. It is known as the Devil's Highway and is well preserved as a footpath and byway over much of its length through Windsor Forest. It is used as a road at West Court, and from Armholes past Heath Pool and along Roman Ride.

The Nine Mile Ride runs the breadth of Finchampstead, through California and then on, between King's Mere and Queen's Mere, to the boundary with Crowthorne, and thence to Pinewood and Bracknell. California is the name of this northern part of the parish. It is a large residential village, containing most of the parish's housing, with its own country park around Longmoor Lake, on the edge of Barkham Common. The southern part of the parish includes the parish church; Finchampstead village itself, at the top of Fleet Hill on the B3348 road; Finchampstead Leas, to the west along the A327 road; and the woodlands of the Ridges, spreading north to the Nine Mile Ride. This is a dense, mostly pine tree, wood much of which, including Simon's Wood, is owned by the National Trust. Its hills give panoramic views of the surrounding area.

== Community facilities ==
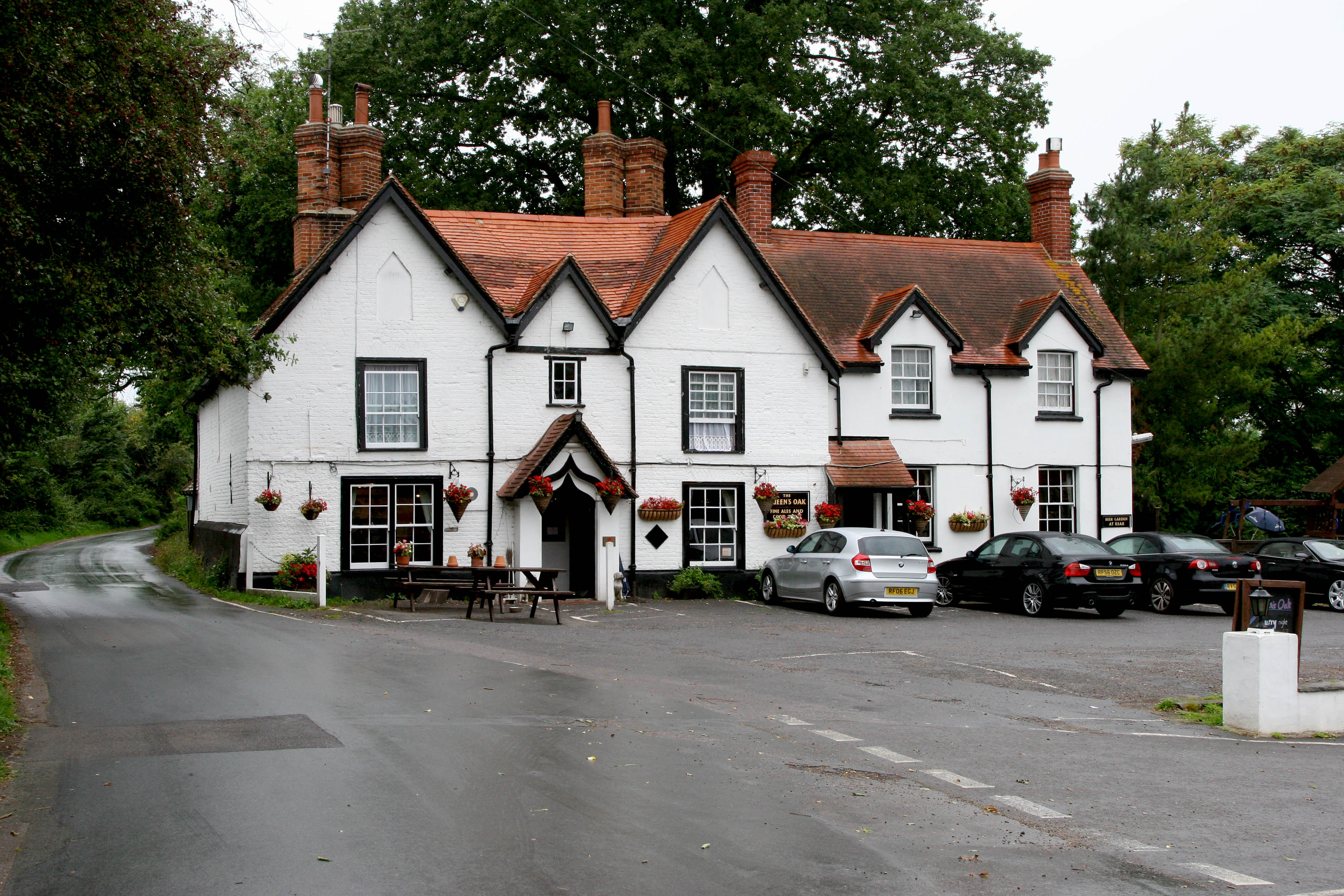
The Queen's Oak Public House

The parish has three public houses: The Greyhound, the Queen's Oak and the Tally Ho. The Tally Ho incorrectly describes itself as being in Eversley. The Queen's Oak is the only pub of that name in England. The absence of public houses in the California area is due to a restrictive covenant imposed by John Walter when he sold the land in this area. Finchampstead Church of England Primary School in the village is opposite the park. There are other schools in California. Finches Pre-School is run daily during term time in the Memorial Hall. The village hall is Finchampstead Memorial Hall, which was built in 1960. The parish has a scout group. There is a children's playground area in the park. There are additional amenities in the parish at California Crossroads.

== Transport ==
Reading Buses service No 3 or "The Leopard Bus," links northern Finchampstead with Wokingham and Reading.

== Churches ==
The parish church of St James is almost entirely Norman, with a few alterations dating from the late 16th century. It has a Norman eastern apse and a brick tower built in 1720. The baptismal font in the church is late Saxon. The Baptist chapel was built in 1840. It was sold for conversion to a private house when the Finchampstead Baptist Church Centre was built in California. St Mary and St John California meets at Gorse Ride Junior School in California. It is a shared ministry with St James.

== Sport and leisure ==
Finchampstead has clubs for cricket, football, netball and running. The village also has some tennis courts. Finchampstead Football Club plays in the Hellenic Football League, and the Memorial Ground is the home ground of both the football and cricket clubs. There is a nature reserve and a Site of Special Scientific Interest at California.

== Notable people ==
- Catherine Bramwell-Booth, granddaughter of The Salvation Army founders, lived in Finchampstead with two of her sisters, Olive Booth and Dora (Dorothy) Booth. The three are buried with their sister Mary Bramwell Booth and alongside their brother Bramwell Bernard Booth and his wife Jane in St James' churchyard. Catherine died aged 104, Olive 98 and Dora 95.
- Christine Keeler lived on the Nine Mile Ride.
- Ernest Macnaghten, former chairman of the Shanghai Municipal Council retired to Haygates in Finchampstead. He died there in 1948.
- Laura Marling, singer-songwriter, grew up and attended primary school in Finchampstead.
- Alfred Stowell Jones, recipient of the Victoria Cross for actions at Delhi during the Indian Rebellion of 1857, is buried in the churchyard of St James'.
- John Watson, recipient of the Victoria Cross for actions at Lucknow during the Indian Mutiny, is buried in St James' churchyard.

== In popular culture ==
In the Netflix show Black Mirror, the episode Bête Noire features a home in The Ridges, doubling for Verity's mansion. The Memorial Ground and Sports Club were used for the Matthew Vaughn produced film Stuntnuts: The Movie. The local petrol station, Cresswells Garage, has featured in the Amazon Prime thriller The Devil's Hour and the E4 miniseries Dead Set.

== Sources ==
- Ditchfield, P.H.; Page, W.H., eds. (1923). A History of the County of Berkshire, Volume 3. Victoria County History. pp. 241–247.
- Pevsner, Nikolaus (1966). Berkshire. The Buildings of England. Harmondsworth: Penguin Books. pp. 143–144.
