= Roman road from Silchester to Bath =

Roman road in England

Coordinates: 51.359°N 1.0318°W

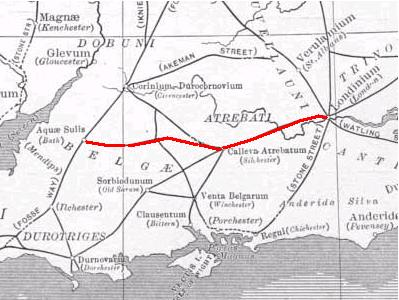
The route from Londinium (London) to Aquae Sulis (Bath) comprised the road from Aquae Sulis to Calleva (Silchester), and then the Devil's Highway connecting Calleva to Londinium.

The Roman road from Silchester to Bath connected Calleva Atrebatum (Silchester) with Aquae Sulis (Bath) via Spinae (Speen), Cunetio (near Marlborough) and Verlucio (near Sandy Lane). The road was a significant route for east–west travel and military logistics in south-east England during the 1st to 5th centuries.

Parts of its route were subsequently followed by earthworks that are presumed to form part of Wansdyke. During the Middle Ages, the road was used by drovers, as well as by merchants and travellers.

Margary numbered the road as 53. Portions of the Roman road are extant, while in other places all apparent vestiges are absent from view. In the early 19th century, Colt-Hoare surveyed and mapped its course from Overton Down (west of Marlborough) to Bath; the rest was only known in isolated sections until a study by Hugh Toller was published in 2013.

== See also ==
- Roman roads in Britain
