= Caesar's Camp =

Caesar's Camp is a name used for many Iron Age hill forts in England.

These include:

Bedfordshire

- Caesar's Camp near Sandy

Berkshire

- Caesar's Camp, Bracknell Forest

Hampshire-Surrey border

- Caesar's Camp, Rushmoor and Waverley, near Farnham

London

- Caesar's Camp on Wimbledon Common
- Caesar's Camp, a disappeared fort on the grounds of Holwood House, a country house in Keston, near Hayes, in the London Borough of Bromley

Somerset

- Caesar's Camp, the former name of Bat's Castle, in the parish of Carhampton south south west of Dunster

Yorkshire

- Caesar's Camp in Scholes Coppice, near Kimberworth in the Metropolitan Borough of Rotherham

== See also ==
- Battle of Caesar's Camp (1793), between the Republican French and coalition armies in northwestern France
