= Caesar's Camp, Bracknell Forest =

Iron Age hill fort in Berkshire, England

Coordinates: 51°22′59″N 0°45′36″W

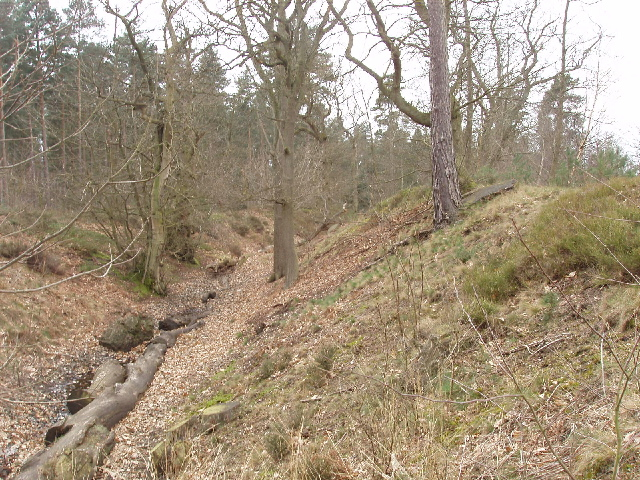
Bank and ditch at Caesar's Camp

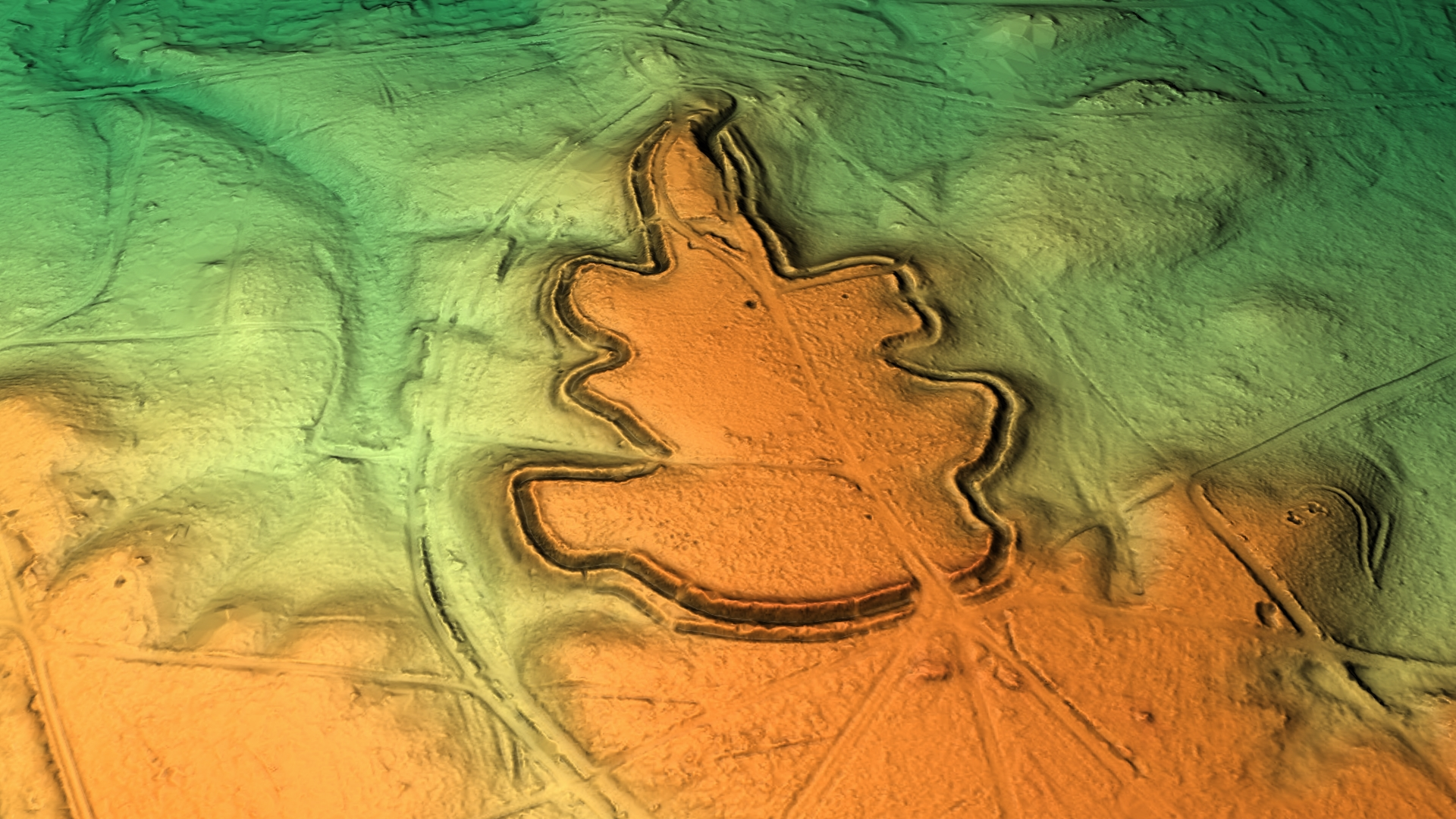
3D view of the digital terrain model

Caesar's Camp is an Iron Age hill fort around 2,400 years old. It is located just in Crowthorne civil parish to the south of Bracknell in the English county of Berkshire. It falls within the Windsor Forest and is well wooded, although parts of the fort have now been cleared of some trees.

The area is managed by the Forestry Commission but owned by Crown Estate, and is open and accessible to the public. The hill fort covers an area of about 17.2 acres (7 hectares) and is surrounded by a mile-long ditch, making it one of the largest in southern England.

== Etymology ==
The origin of the name "Caesar's Camp" is unknown. However, the hill fort is close to the Roman road known as the Devil's Highway, and this may have led Medieval mapmakers to attribute the structure (wrongly) to the Romans.

== History ==
Caesar's Camp is thought to have been established around 500–300BC. It is the only hill fort of its type that has been identified in east Berkshire. Because the area had a thick bed of sandstone beneath the top layers of soil, it was likely not suitable for farming – the community at Caesar's Camp was therefore dependent on the produce of neighbouring settlements. Caesar's Camp was therefore most likely used as an assembly point and a marketplace. Its huge outer walls and 1-mile-long (1.6 km) dump rampart also suggest that it was used as a safe haven in case of attack.

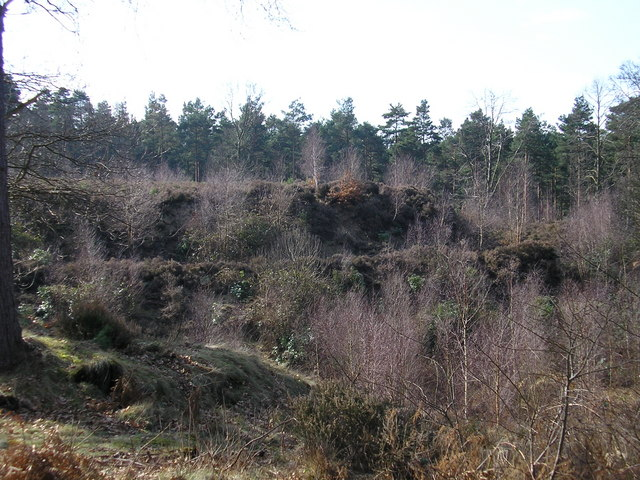
Multivallate defences at Caesar's Camp

Caesar's Camp appears to have fallen under the rule of Cunobelin, king of the Catuvellauni tribe in the first century AD from a coin discovered in the interior. Soon after, the Romans invaded England; after this time, there is no evidence that Caesar's Camp continued to exist as an inhabited community. A road from its south entrance was later built, connecting it to the Devil's Highway (Roman Britain). There is a small Roman settlement about halfway along this road, known as Wickham Bushes, which has yielded pottery and other Roman artifacts. The main Roman road connected Londinium with Calleva Atrebatum, the tribal capital of the Atrebates, about 10 miles to the west in Hampshire.

A redoubt roughly 40 m across in the fort is thought to be part of a defence line built in 1792 in preparation for the Napoleonic Wars.

== Description ==
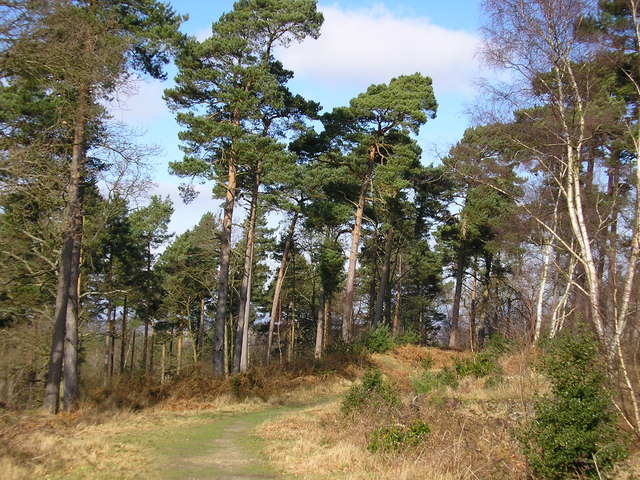
Scots pines on bank at Caesar's Camp

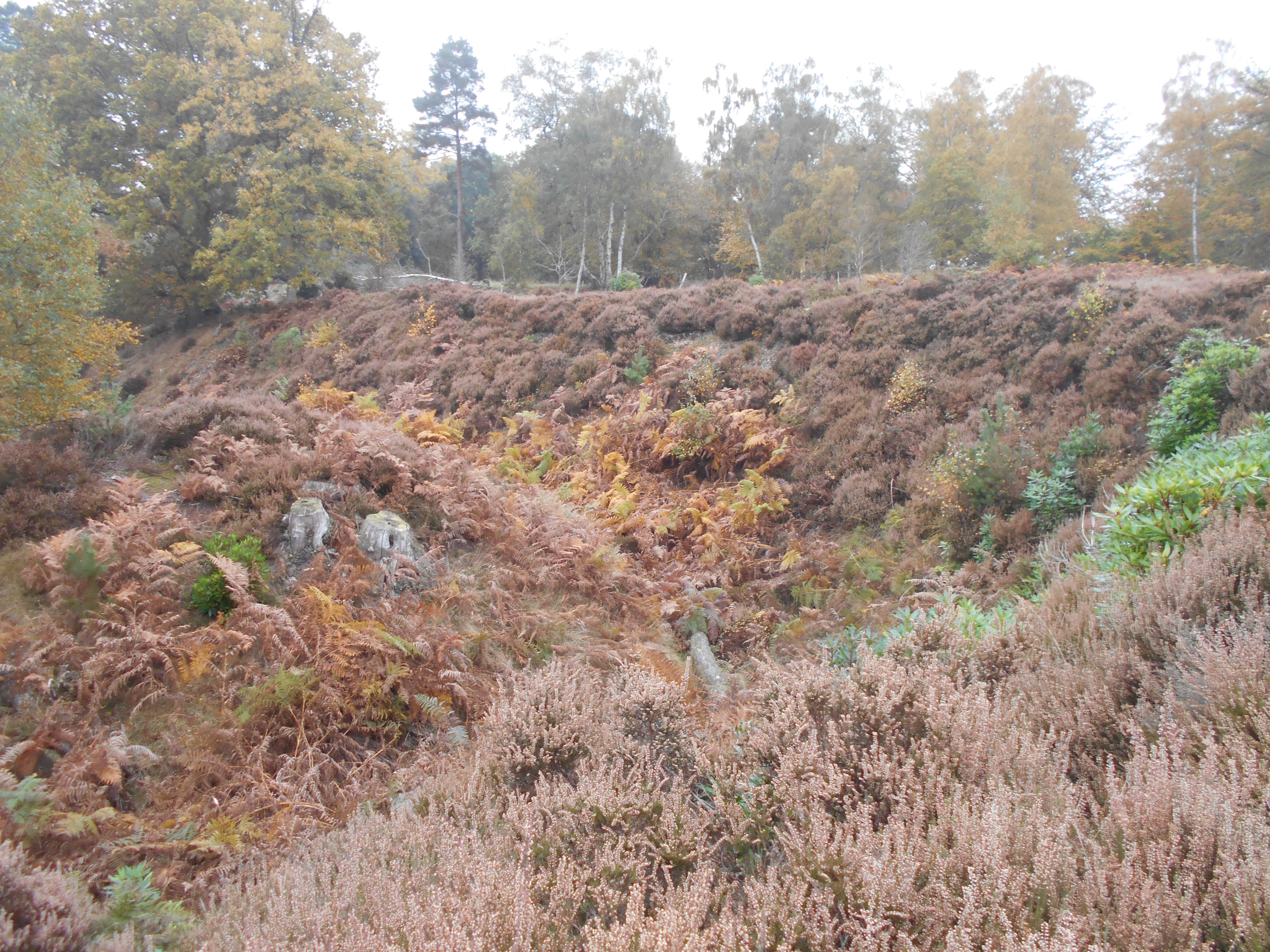
Heather on upper rampart at Caesar's Camp

The layout consists of a number of steep banks and ditches in the shape of an oak leaf, enclosing a large flat area of a settlement. The main entrance is at its northern end (at the tip of the leaf) and is very well defended with multiple banks and a sinuous entrance road. The banks to the side of the entrance are very steep, guiding any entrants along the way. It is north of the Roman road known as the Devil's Highway which connected Londinium to Calleva Atrebatum (Silchester). It is within the Crowthorne Woods part of Swinley Forest crown plantation and is located off Nine Mile Ride approximately 0.75 miles (1.2 km) from the Look Out visitor centre.

Much of the fort is covered by mature broadleaf and coniferous trees, although some of the spruce plantation on the southern part of the fort has been cleared, and the ground reverted to heathland and scrub. On clear days, central Bracknell and Crowthorne, including Broadmoor hospital, are visible from its highest points. The camp falls within the Broadmoor to Bagshot Woods and Heaths Site of Special Scientific Interest, and forms part of the northern edge of the SSI. The zone protects numerous rare birds such as the woodlark and nightjar, as well as its diverse insect life and fauna.

It is an entirely hand-built complex. The camp has suffered significant erosion, both natural and man-made. Efforts have been made by Bracknell Forest Council to restore some of the natural parts. A geophysical survey (examining the sub-structures) of 2 ha in the southern part of the fort was undertaken in 1995 before the restoration work. It found some evidence for sustained occupation and structures; the survey did find a ditch type anomaly within the western ramparts and a scatter of pit type anomalies.

== 1978 People's Free Festival ==
The site was reoccupied between 29 August and 8 September 1978, when it became the location of the last of the Windsor Free Festivals in 1978, after the forced removal of those attempting to attend the People's Free Festival, in Windsor Great Park, by police.

== See also ==
- Thames Basin Heaths
