= Thames Basin Heaths =

Ecological region in southern England

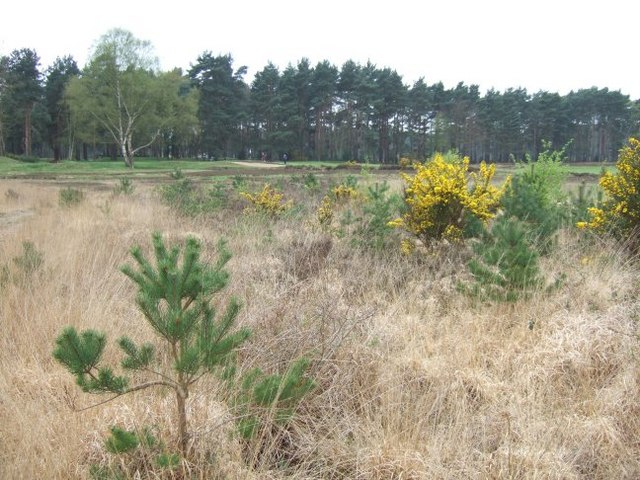
Chobham Common looking towards Sunningdale Golf Course

The Thames Basin Heaths are a natural region in southern England in Berkshire, Hampshire and Surrey, a slightly mottled east-west belt of ecologically recognised and protected land.

They are recognised as national character area 129 by Natural England. They cover 118,529 hectares (457.64 sq mi) of countryside. Inset towns include Newbury, Camberley, Ascot and Woking, To the west sit the Berkshire Downs, across similar size, well-drained, and intensively farmed, sports-use or settled Thames floodplains to the north are the similarly protected Chilterns and to the near south are the Hampshire Downs.

== Environment ==
The terrain of the heathland is characterized by flat or gently sloping plateaux with numerous watercourses incising broad or sometimes steep-sided valleys. Apart from these, the heaths are lower heading east (before the London Basin) and along the main river valleys to the low-lying areas of the Kennet floodplain and lower reaches of the Loddon and its largest tributary, the Blackwater. At the western edge is the chalk scarp of the Hampshire Downs. The highest elevation is 296 metres.

== Drainage ==
The other main watercourses are the Basingstoke Canal, the Kennet & Avon Canal, the Wey, Whitewater, Pang and Mole.

== Protected areas ==
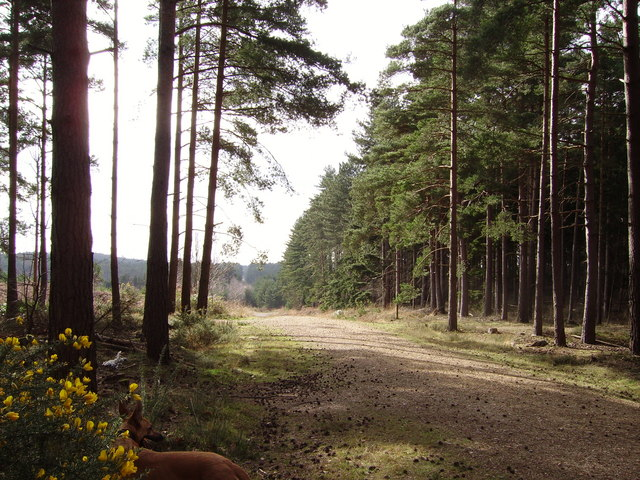
Track through the forestry plantation in the Broadmoor to Bagshot Woods and Heaths SSI

Just over 20,000 hectares (17%) sits in the North Wessex Downs AONB.

The zone has:

- Two Special Protection Areas: Thames Basin Heaths SPA; and South West London Waterbodies SPA
- Three Special Areas of Conservation: Thursley, Hankley and Frensham Commons, Ash, Pirbright and Chobham SAC; Kennet Valley Alderwoods SAC; and Kennet and Lambourn Floodplain SAC
- Three national nature reserves: Chobham Common NNR; Castle Bottom NNR; Ashford Hill NNR.

There are many Sites of Special Scientific Interest or SSSIs within – one of the largest is the Broadmoor to Bagshot Woods and Heaths SSSI where rare types of birds and other species are professionally monitored and conserved.

Much of the east of the zone there can be easily traced a Roman Road, the Devil's Highway (Roman Britain). The region has an Iron Age hillfort, one of several so-named, in this case specifically, Caesar's Camp, Bracknell Forest.

== Incursionary barriers ==
Ecologically near-sterile obstacles to migration, coupled with longstanding biome and habitat loss are significant. Chiefly these are the:

- M3 motorway
- M4 motorway

To a lesser extent (the narrower) main routes of rail and road:

- The South West Main Line
- The Waterloo to Reading Line
- The Ascot to Guildford Line
- A30
- A329

No wildlife crossings to abate these obstacles have yet been made.

== See also ==
- Thames Valley
