= Glevum =

Roman fort, predecessor to Gloucester, UK

Coordinates: 51.867°N 2.249°W

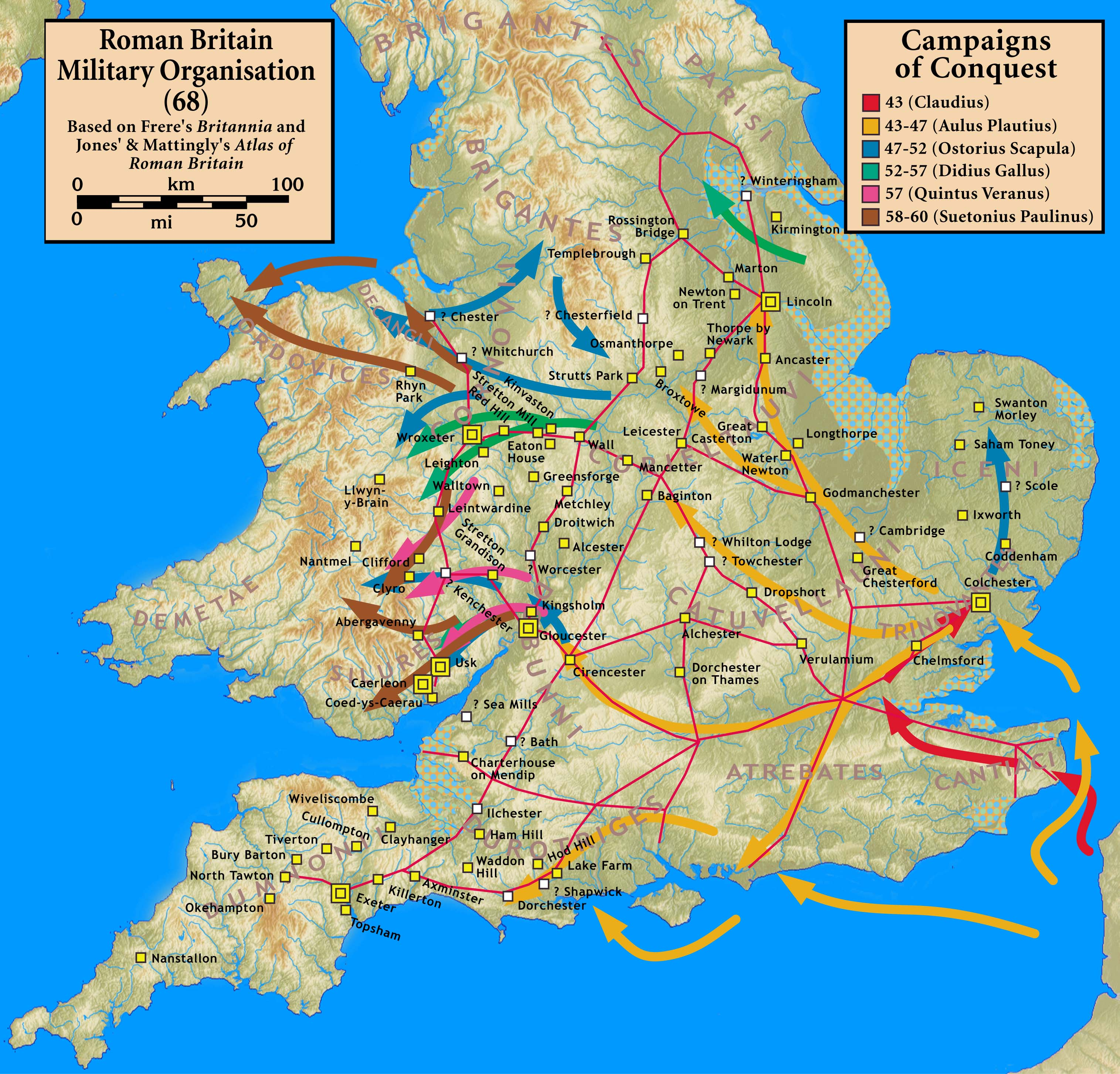
Conquest of Roman Britain campaigns 43–60 AD

Glevum (or, more formally, Colonia Nervia Glevensium, or occasionally Glouvia) was originally a Roman fort in Roman Britain that became a "colonia" of retired legionaries in AD 97. Today, it is known as Gloucester, in the English county of Gloucestershire. The name Glevum is taken by many present-day businesses in the area and also by the 26-mile Glevum Way, a long-distance footpath or recreational walk encircling modern Gloucester.

== Fortress ==
Glevum was established around AD 48, at an important crossing of the River Severn, and near to the Fosse Way, the early front line after the Roman invasion of Britain. Initially, a Roman fort was established at present-day Kingsholm in c. 65–70 AD.

The Roman Legions based here were probably the Legio XX Valeria Victrix until 66 and then Legio II Augusta for their invasion of Roman Wales between 66 and 74 AD.

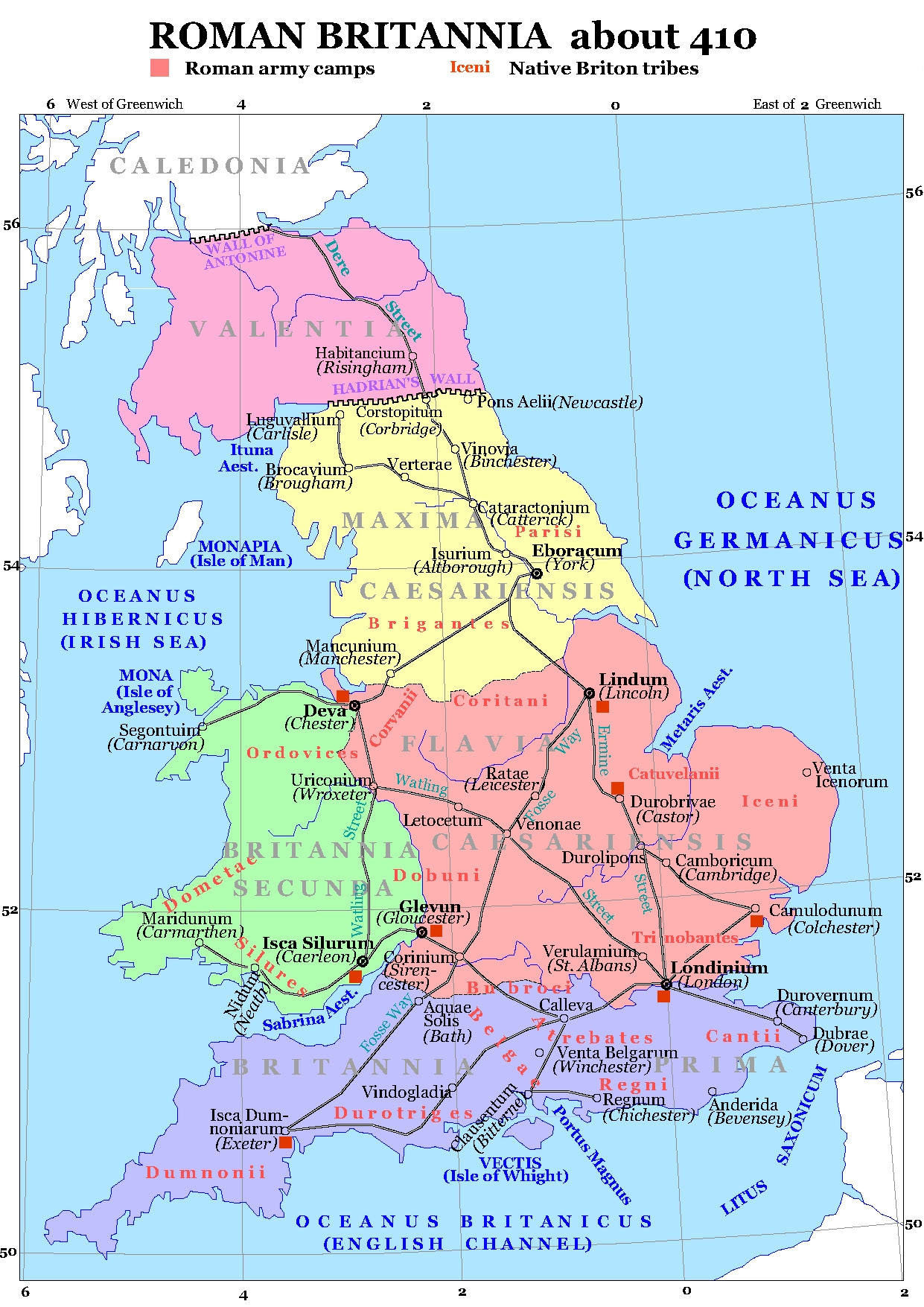
Roman Britain in 410 showing major roads and cities

Between AD 81 and 98, larger replacement walls were built on slightly higher ground nearby, centred on present-day Gloucester Cross which was probably part of the change from a military fort to a walled colonia after the Legio II Augusta had been transferred to Caerleon. The civilian settlement also grew outside the walls.

== Colonia ==
In AD 97, the city was designated a colonia by the Emperor Nerva. A colonia was the residence of retired legionaries and enjoyed the highest status of city in the Empire. The legionaries were given farmland in the surrounding district, and could be called upon as a Roman auxiliary armed force.

The city was built within the legionary fortress and used the same rectilinear street plan and ramparts. A large and impressive administrative basilica and forum market-place were built in the town, as well as many fine homes with mosaic floors.

Roman Britain was divided into four provinces in the early 4th century. It is most likely that Glevum, as a colony, became the provincial capital of Britannia Secunda, in the same way that colonies at York and Lincoln became capitals of their respective provinces. There is some evidence that at this time Glevum possessed a mint.

On the outskirts of Gloucester, archaeologists have discovered evidence of a mint producing counterfeit coins. This would confirm a mint in Gloucester.

The Roman wharf where goods were shipped via an inlet from the River Severn has been excavated at Upper Quay Street and which dendrochronological dating has shown was built from 74 AD.

At its height, Glevum may have had a population of as many as 10,000 people.

The entire area around Glevum was intensely Romanised in the second and third centuries, with a higher than normal distribution of villas, as a result of its suitability for the traditional intensive Roman farming methods. Today, some of the best examples of Roman villas in Britain, including Chedworth villa and Woodchester villa, both famous for their Roman mosaics, are not far from Glevum.

== Decline ==
Excavations at Gloucester's New Market Hall in the 1960s showed that Romano-British occupation of the town may have continued in some form into the sub-Roman period, even if the town's population may have been greatly reduced. A new portal in the town's wall was built at the beginning of the sixth century, showing a modest growth of the town after the Battle of Mons Badonicus.

The Anglo-Saxon Chronicle records a King Coinmail (according to the original A-text), who may have come from Gloucester, taking part in the Battle of Dyrham in 577, when the city was conquered by the Anglo-Saxons.

== Remains ==
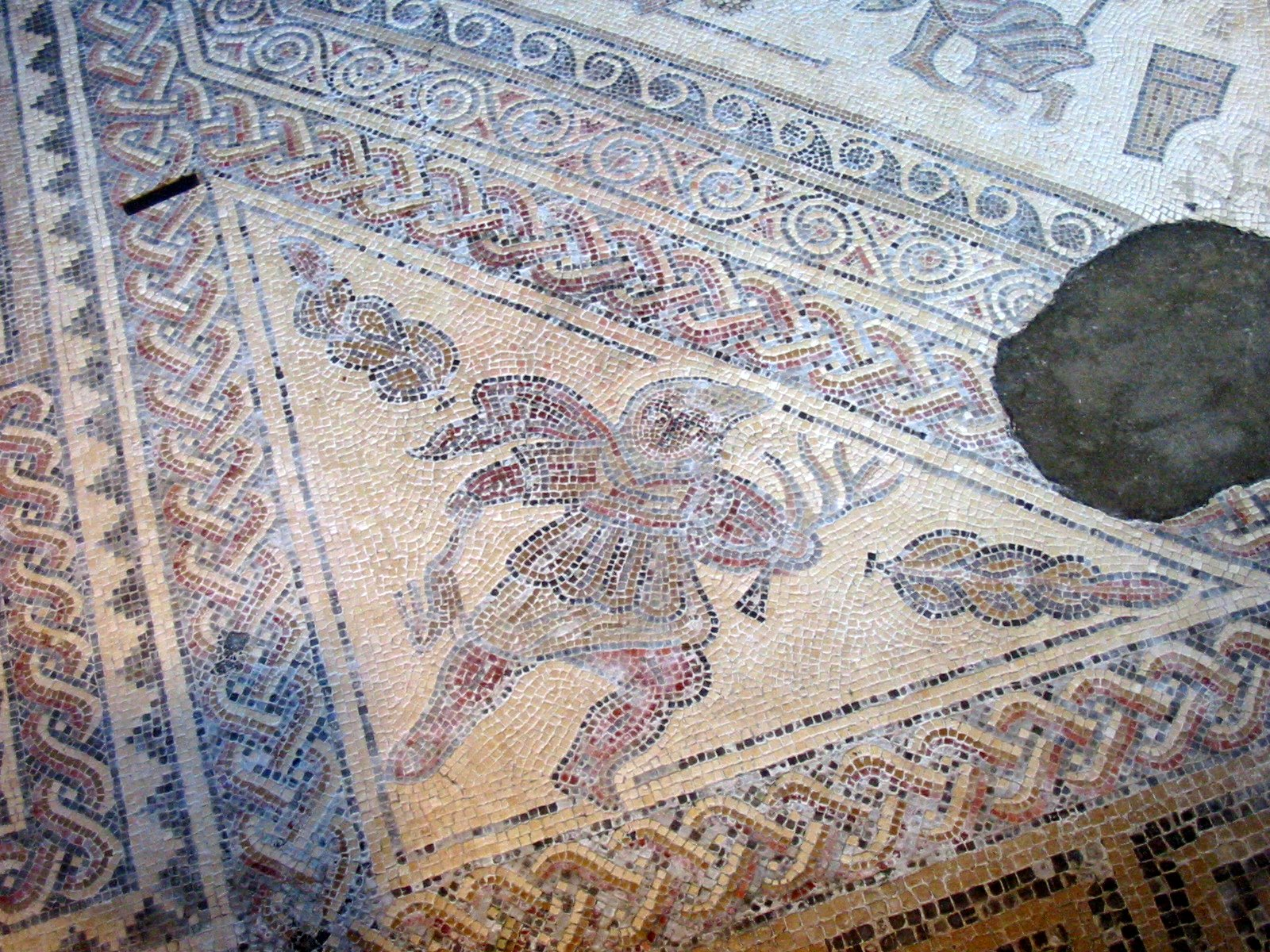
Detail of one of the mosaics from the Chedworth Roman villa near Glevum

- Many archaeological artifacts and some in situ walls from Roman Glevum may be seen in the Gloucester City Museum & Art Gallery
- The remains of the Roman and medieval East Gate are on display in the East Gate Chamber on Eastgate Street.
- There was a small display in the former Royal Bank of Scotland premises on the Roman finds found from the site, but the branch has now closed and the building is currently empty.
- Northgate, Southgate, Eastgate and Westgate Streets all follow the line of their original Roman counterparts, although Westgate Street has moved slightly north and Southgate Street now extends through the site of the Roman basilica.
- An equestrian statue of the Emperor Nerva was erected at the entrance to Southgate Street in 2002. It was created by Anthony Stone and paid for by public subscription, following a campaign that started in 1997, the 1,900th anniversary of the colonia's foundation.
- Roman building remains, associated mosaics and a portion of a Roman street were found under a former Debenhams Department Store at the site of the new City Campus development of the University of Gloucester.

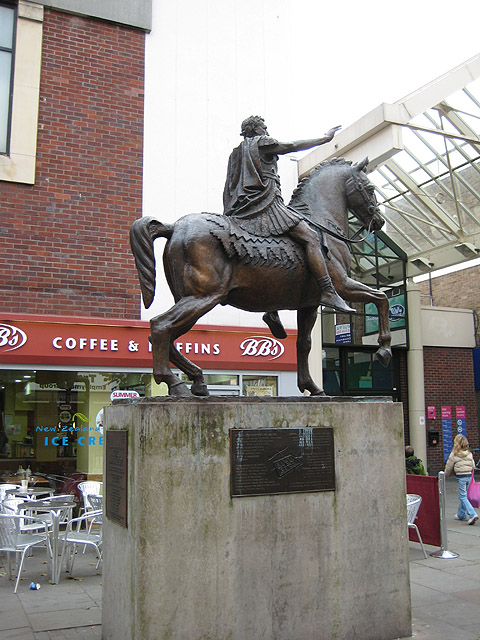
Modern statue of Emperor Nerva in Gloucester. Nerva made Glevum a colonia.
