= Calleva Atrebatum =

British iron age settlement

- Silchester Roman Town
- Site plan of Calleva Atrebatum, drawn before 1911

- Location within Hampshire
- 51°21′26″N 1°4′57″W
- Type: Settlement
- Periods: Iron Age to Roman Empire
- Location: Silchester, Hampshire, England
- Region: Britannia
- Part of: Britannia, Britannia Superior, then Britannia Prima

History
- Built: Late 1st century BC
- Built by: Atrebates tribe
- Abandoned: 5th to 7th century AD

Site notes
- Area: Approximately 40 ha (99 acres)
- Archaeologists: University of Reading and others
- Management: English Heritage
- Website: Silchester Roman City Walls and Amphitheatre

Calleva Atrebatum ("Calleva of the Atrebates") was an Iron Age oppidum, the capital of the Atrebates tribe. It then became a walled town in the Roman province of Britannia, at a major crossroads of the roads of southern Britain.

The modern village of Silchester in Hampshire, England, is about a mile (1.6 km) to the west of the site. The village's parish church of St Mary the Virgin is just within the ancient walls. Most of the site lies within the modern civil parish of Silchester, although the amphitheatre is in the adjoining civil parish of Mortimer West End. The whole of the site is within the local authority district of Basingstoke and Deane and the county of Hampshire.

== History ==
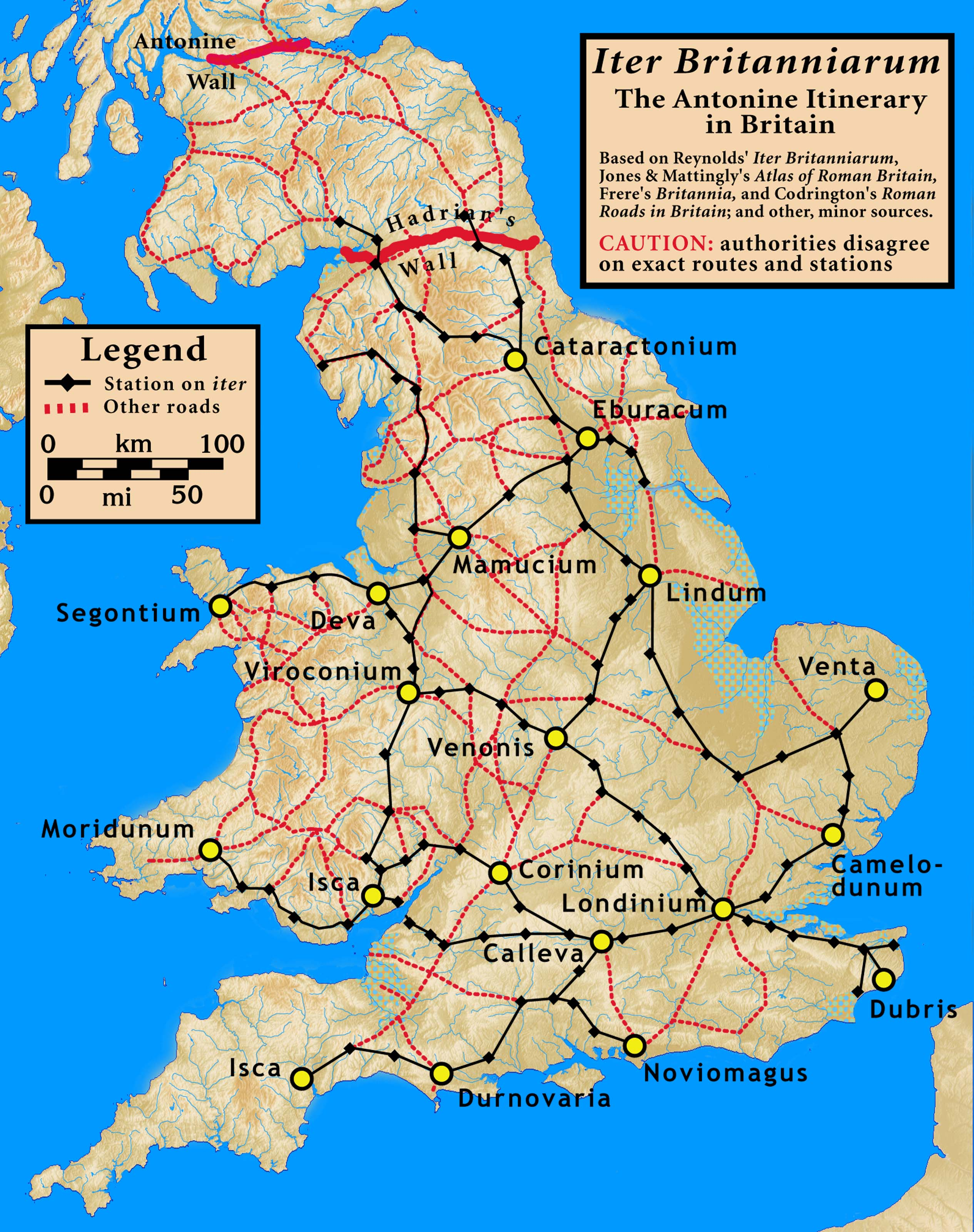
A map of major 2nd-century Roman roads, showing the importance of Calleva as a crossroads and also point of trifurcation of the routes leading to Glevum (Gloucester), South Wales and the South West Peninsula from Londinium (London)

Calleva Atrebatum ("Calleva of the Atrebates") was an Iron Age settlement, as capital of the Atrebates tribe. It became a walled town in the Roman province of Britannia.

=== Celtic beginnings ===
The Romanised Celtic "Calleva" can be translated to 'woods' or 'woody place'. The settlement was surrounded by dense woodlands that were used for fuel and to build structures. Given its access to east, west and northern domestic markets it was a centre of trade within Britain and with civilisations across the Channel and as far away as the Mediterranean.

=== Iron Age ===
The Late Iron Age settlement at Silchester has been shown by archaeology and coins of the British Q series to link Silchester with the seat of power of the Atrebates. Coins found stamped with "COMMIOS" show that Commius, king of the Atrebates, established his territory and mint here after moving from Gaul. The inner earthwork, constructed c. 1 AD, enclosed 32 hectares (79 acres) and at a similar time others were built in the surrounds.

Small areas of Late Iron Age occupation were first uncovered on the south side of the inner earthwork and around the south gate. More detailed evidence for this was excavated below the forum/basilica. Several roundhouses, wells and pits were in a northeast–southwest alignment, dated to c. 25 BC – 15 BC. Occupation of c. 15 BC to AD 40 or 50 resulted in metalled streets, rubbish pits and palisaded enclosures. Imported Gallo-Belgic fine wares, amphorae and iron and copper-alloy brooches show that the settlement was high status. Distinctive food was identified, including oyster shell, a large briquetage assemblage and sherds from various amphorae for olive oil, fish sauce and wine.

Further such material was uncovered by the Insula IX 'Town Life' project, including a great boundary ditch probably made about 40 to 20 BC, a large rectangular hall which could have been built any time between 25 BC to AD 10, and the laying out of lanes and new property divisions from about AD 10 to AD 40 or 50. Archaeobotanical studies have demonstrated the import and consumption of celery, coriander and olives in Insula IX before the Claudian Conquest.

=== Roman ===
After the Roman conquest of Britain in 43 AD the settlement developed into the Roman town of Calleva Atrebatum. Unusually for an Iron Age tribal town in Britain, its exact site was reused for the Roman town. The Romans changed the layout and defences.

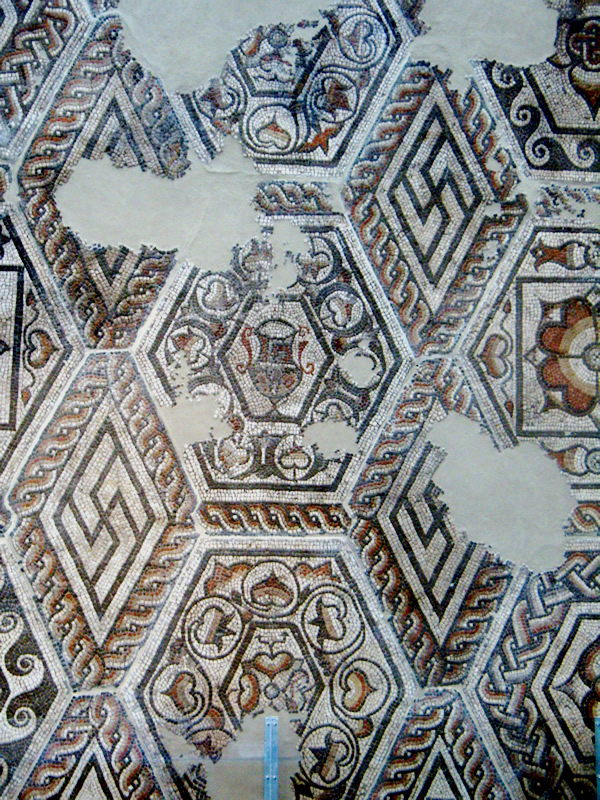
Mosaic from Calleva Atrebatum

It was slightly larger, covering about 40 hectares (99 acres), and was laid out to a clear, new street grid. The town had several public buildings and flourished until the early Anglo-Saxon period.

A large mansio was in Insula VIII, near the South Gate, consisting of three wings arranged around a courtyard. A possible nymphaeum was near to the amphitheatre to the north of the walled city.

Calleva was a major crossroads. The Devil's Highway connected it with the provincial capital Londinium (London). From Calleva, this road divided into routes to various other points west, including the road to Aquae Sulis (Bath); Ermin Way to Glevum (Gloucester); and the Port Way to Sorviodunum (Old Sarum near modern Salisbury).

The earthworks and, for much of the circumference, the ruined walls are still visible. The remains of the amphitheatre, added about AD 70–80 and outside the city walls, can also be clearly seen. The area inside the walls is now largely farmland with no visible distinguishing features other than the enclosing earthworks and walls, with a tiny mediaeval church in one corner. At its peak, the Roman amphitheatre would have housed around seven thousand spectators. Within, bear fighting, gladiator fighting, and other forms of entertainment were put on. Around the third century, renovations were made to the stadium including two new stadium entrances were added and the shape was turned into a more elliptical layout. After the Romans retreated, the British and the Anglo-Saxons continued to use the amphitheatre.

In the southeast of the city were the thermal baths. They belong to the earliest stone buildings of the city, which were perhaps built around 50 AD. The baths are not aligned with the later city grid, and the entrance area was rebuilt to fit into the new road network. Several construction phases can be distinguished. At first they consisted of a portico, a palaestra and the bath rooms behind. The portico was later removed and the bathrooms divided in half, presumably so that men and women could bathe separately.

There is a spring that emanates from inside the walls, near the original baths, and flows south-eastwards where it joins Silchester Brook. The Roman Calleva flourished (to nearly 10,000 inhabitants in the third/fourth century) around these springs that served the Roman baths excavated in summer 2019.

=== Sub-Roman and medieval ===
After the Roman withdrawal from Britain, Calleva Atrebatum remained inhabited, but its fortunes began to falter. Major buildings at the site were used c. 400–430, but evidence of occupation begins to decline sharply after AD 450. According to Daniel G. Russo the hypothesis that the city remained in use during the sixth century, thanks to its sturdy walls, is "attractive", but based largely on guesswork, as "there is no firm written or archaeological evidence that organised Romano-British urban life existed at Calleva beyond c. 450 at the latest." This is in contrast to most other Roman towns in Britain, which continued to exist after the end of the Roman era; Calleva is one of the six that did not survive the sub-Roman era, and disappeared in the Middle Ages. (That said, the historian David Nash Ford identifies the site with the Cair Celemion of Nennius's list of the 28 cities of Sub-Roman Britain, which, if true, would mean that the site was at least partially extant during the Early Middle Ages.)

A hypothesis has emerged that the Saxons deliberately avoided Calleva after it was abandoned, preferring to maintain their existing centres at Winchester and Dorchester. There was a gap of perhaps a century before the twin Saxon towns of Basing and Reading were founded on rivers either side of Calleva. As a consequence, Calleva has been subject to relatively benign neglect for most of the last two millennia.

== Culture ==
=== Agriculture ===
The study of waterlogged macrofossils through a series of wells throughout the abandoned civilisation resulted in key evidence of animal stabling, hay meadows management, and the use of heath resources (such as heathers, gorse, and heathland grasses). The most abundant crops that were found in the area are Capsella bursa pastoris, Chenopodium album, Polygonum aviculare, Stellaria media and Urtica urens, Fallopia convolvulus and Sisymbrium. The use of new oil crops and grassland management is evident that the agricultural upheaval changes were related to those that provide food to livestock rather than providing food to the population of the civilisation. The development of the land represents a major change in the social organisation and settlement form. This is evident in the ample earthwork or large artificial banks of soil.

Between the Hampshire chalk downs and alluvium-rich flood plains of the Thames valley, the civilisation is on a gravel terrace of the River Kennet, a major tributary of the Thames. This has left beneath its thin much later organic topsoil, feet of tertiary clay and sand. If ploughed the result is a "well-drained brown-earth soil" which, unirrigated, and without high fertilisation, yields low cereal returns. It is traditionally often cleared as pasture, orchards or kept as bramble-rich woodland for hogs and game. Palaeoenvironmental studies of the Early Iron Age at this site expose largely cleared land. Development of the heath from this time is evidenced by pollen analysis.

=== Diet ===
The study of plant remains from the across the city and especially Insula IX have shown that spelt, wheat and barley were the most common cereals consumed. A wide range of fruits (apple, fig, grape), flavourings (celery, coriander, dill), and pulses (celtic bean, pea) were consumed. Many houses had their own rotary querns for grinding flour. Cattle, sheep/goat and pig were the major sources of meat.

=== Religion ===
There is a range of evidence for religious practices in the town. A possible church was to the south-east of the Forum in Insula IV. The apse-ended basilica building has a layout comparable to early churches in the western Roman empire, but the date is likely to be pre-Constantinian. A Romano-Celtic temple was in Insula XXXV, where an inscription shows a dedication by the guild of peregrini. Three Romano-Celtic temples were in Insula XXX, just inside the east gate. These temples were constructed in the mid first century AD and went out of use after c. AD 200. A limestone head of Serapis was discovered in 1899 at Silchester Common.

=== Death and burial ===
Late Iron Age cremation burials have been excavated at Latchmere Green and Windabout Copse. The Roman cemeteries are thought to have been to the north and west of the Outer Earthwork, and have not been investigated. A tombstone recovered in 1577 reads "To the memory of Flavia Victorina Titus Tammonius, Her husband set this up".

=== Defence ===
Built in two phases, the defence system of Calleva Atrebatum is evident in the remains of the North Gate. Construction of the wall surrounding the area first began around 200 AD. Parts of this rampart still remain in stone and tile remnants. In 270 AD, the defences were strengthened with an even larger stone wall. Defences were most probably strengthened due to the increasing number of Saxon raids in the area. The defence systems worked to protect from local uprisings, pillaging, and invaders from abroad. They also allowed for traffic to be monitored both in and out of the city.

== Economy ==
=== Craft production ===
Various craft activities have been evidenced through excavations in Insula IX, including bone- and antler- working, the working of copper-alloys, and leather-working. Imported whetstones were recycled into whetstones.

=== Building material ===
Production taking place in the area around Silchester includes a complex of tile kilns at Little London, including two tiles stamped with the title of the Emperor Nero. Because of the abundance of woods in the area, most of the structures were built out of timber.

=== Trade ===
A wide range of objects were imported to Silchester from the Roman Empire, including an ivory razor handle, a handle from a Fusshenkelkruge and a Harpocrates figure from a Campanian brazier. Imported ceramics include Central Gaulish samian produced in Lezoux, Dressel 2-4 and 14 amphora, Rhineland white ware mortaria, Moselkeramik black slipped ware and Cologne colour coated ware.

== Archaeology ==
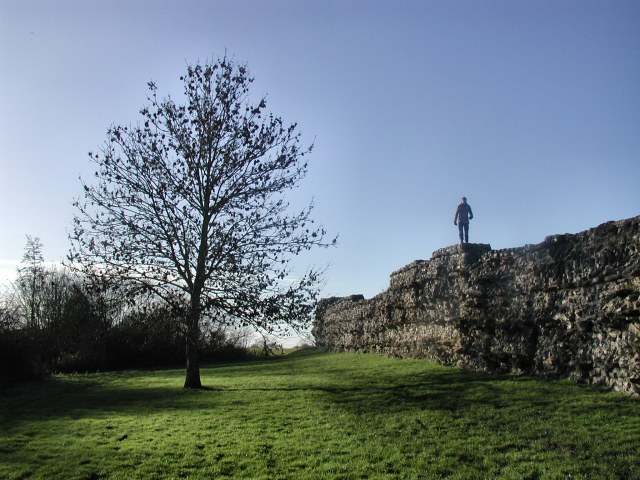
Part of the city walls (2004)

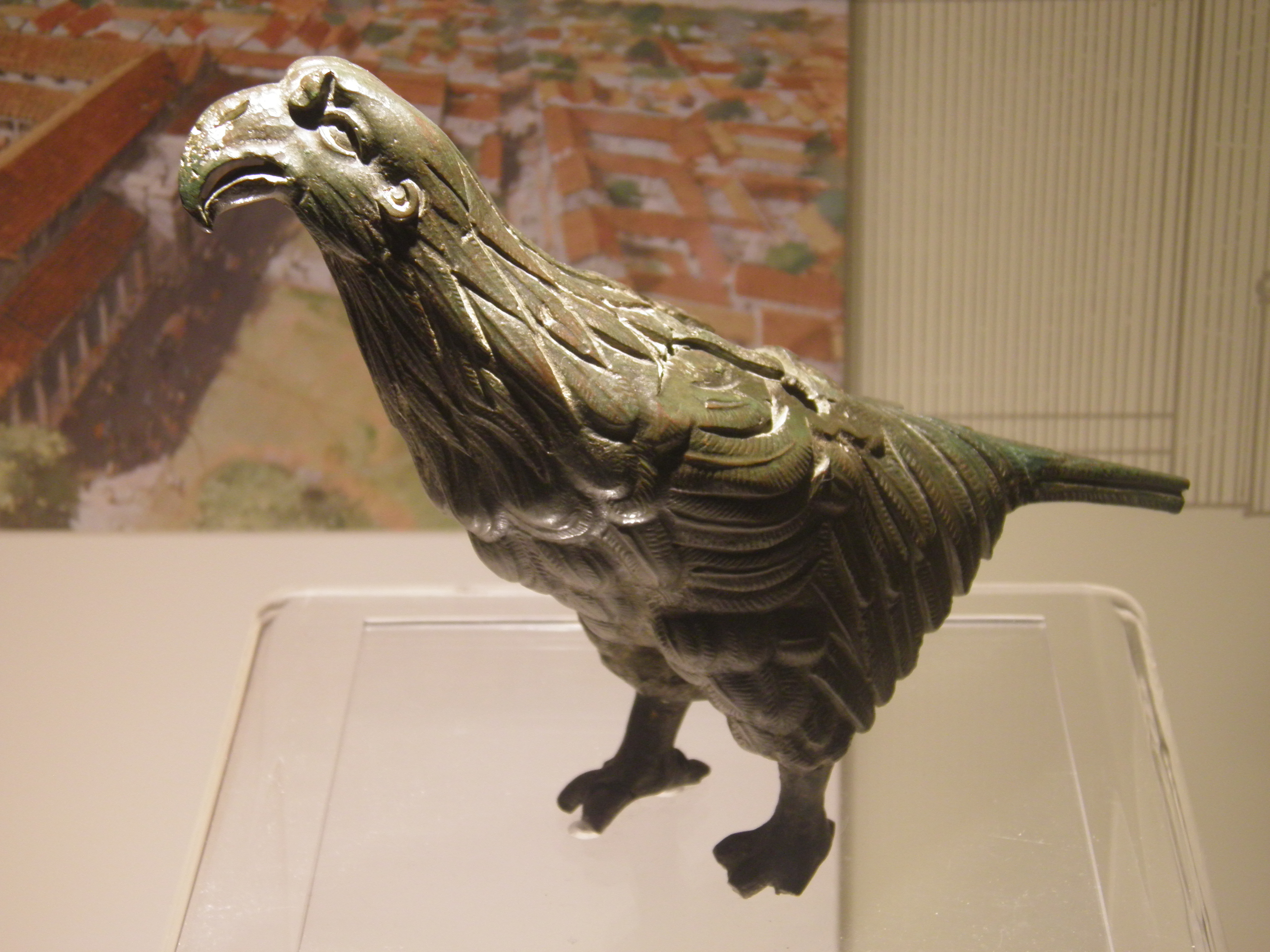
Silchester eagle

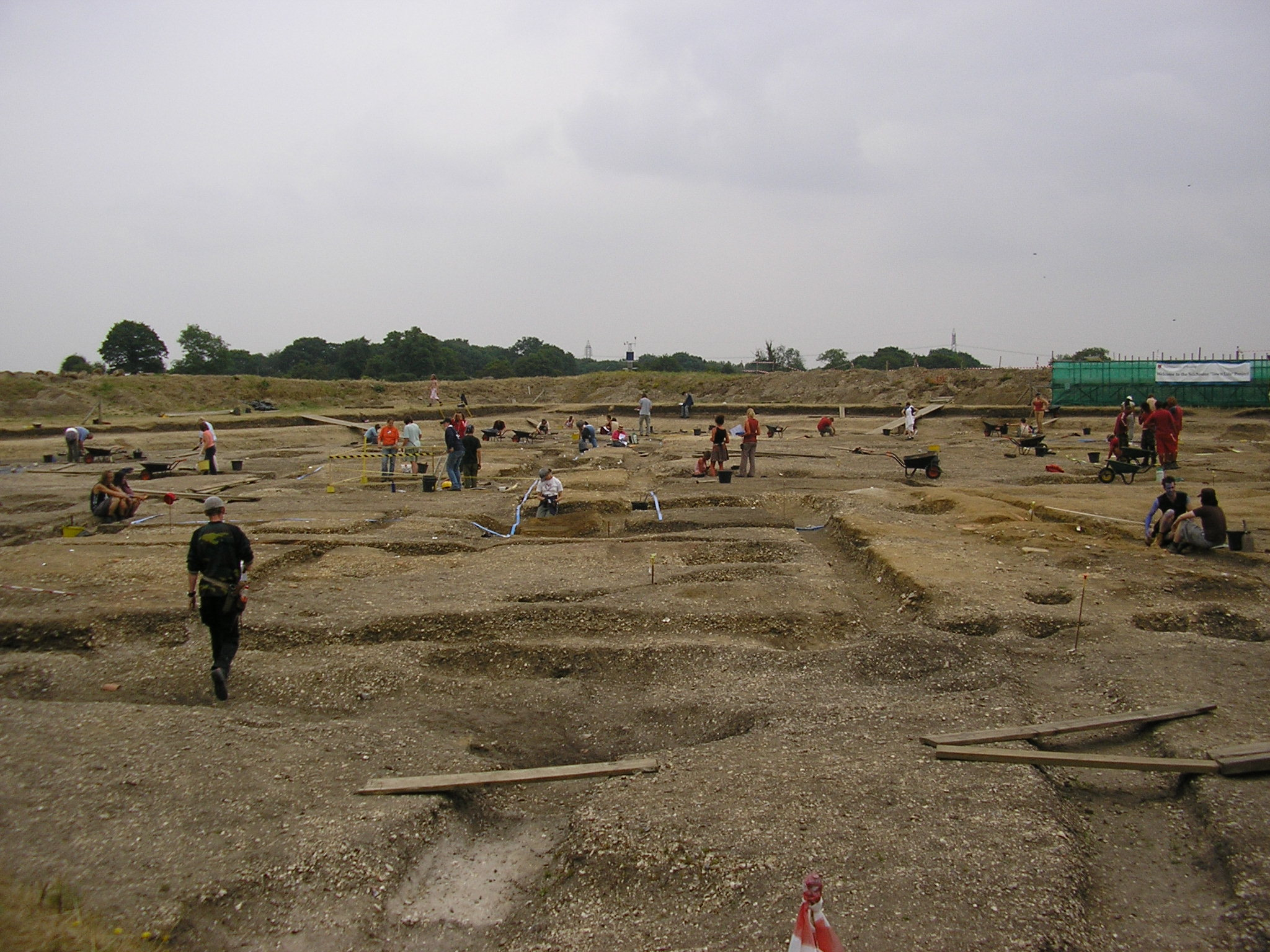
Excavations at Calleva (Insula IX)

Calleva Atrebatum was first excavated by the Reverend James Joyce who, in 1866, discovered the bronze eagle known as the Silchester eagle, now in the Museum of Reading. It may originally have formed part of a Jupiter statue in the forum.

Although it had long been known that there was an abandoned Roman civilisation, excavations ordered by the landowner, the Duke of Wellington, only began in the late nineteenth century. Joyce was the designated observer and recorder of all archaeological records. His overall goal was to reveal the complete plan of the Roman town. Little further investigation occurred until the 1961 re-excavation of the early Christian Church where the researchers found that eighty to ninety percent of the excavation had been completed. Within those limited excavations, the foundation and the plans of the masonry buildings were exposed. They were discovered by digging trenches through the area. The architecture and archaeology of the timber buildings of the ancient Roman town were misunderstood at the time of the excavation, timber was the most notable material.

Molly Cotton carried out excavations on the defences in 1938–39. Since the 1970s Michael Fulford and the University of Reading have undertaken several excavations on the town walls (1974–1980), amphitheatre (1979–1985) and the forum basilica (1977, 1980–1986), which have revealed remarkably good preservation of items from both the Iron Age and early Roman occupations.

From 1997 to 2014 Reading University carried out sustained and concentrated excavations in Insula IX. Results of the Late Roman, Mid Roman and Late Iron Age phases have been published. In 2013, excavations began in Insula III, investigating a structure identified by the Victorian excavations as a bathhouse. From 2018, the University of Reading has re-explored the previously excavated ruins of the public bathhouse looking at what earlier excavators may have missed.

Silchester Amphitheatre Panorama 360 degrees (2016)

== Access ==
Now primarily owned by Hampshire County Council and managed by English Heritage, the site of Calleva is open to the public during daylight hours, seven days a week and without charge. The full circumference of the walls is accessible, as is the amphitheatre. The interior is farmed and, with the exception of the church and a single track that bisects the interior, inaccessible.

The Museum of Reading in Reading Town Hall has a gallery devoted to Calleva, displaying many archaeological finds from the excavations.
