= Silchester =

Village and civil parish in Hampshire, England

Coordinates: 51.353°N 1.101°W

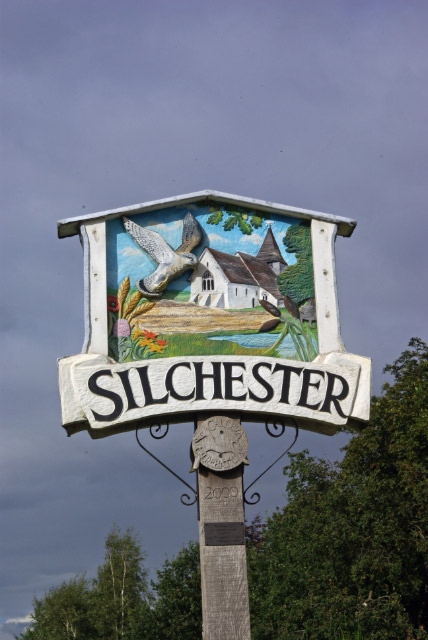
- The village sign in front of Silchester Village Hall, showing St Mary's Church

- Location within Hampshire
- Population: 1,079 (2021 Census including Little London)
- OS grid reference: SU6262
- Civil parish: Silchester
- District: Basingstoke and Deane
- Shire county: Hampshire
- Region: South East
- Country: England
- Sovereign state: United Kingdom
- Post town: Reading
- Postcode district: RG7
- Dialling code: 0118
- Police: Hampshire and Isle of Wight
- Fire: Hampshire and Isle of Wight
- Ambulance: South Central
- UK Parliament: North East Hampshire
- Website: Silchester Parish Council

Silchester is a village and civil parish about 5 miles (8 km) north of Basingstoke in Hampshire. It is adjacent to the county boundary with Berkshire and about 9 miles (14 km) south-west of Reading.

Silchester is most notable for the archaeological site and Roman town of Calleva Atrebatum, an Iron Age and later Atrebates settlement first occupied by the Romans in about AD 45. The site includes what is considered the best-preserved Roman town wall in Great Britain and the remains of what may be one of the earliest Christian churches found in the British Isles.

Today, the modern village lies just outside the ancient Roman walls and maintains a rural character, with a small population and local amenities including a village hall, a pub, and access to walking trails on its extensive commons.

== Archaeology ==
Archaeological research around Silchester and the Roman town of Calleva Atrebatum has focused on long-term landscape development, particularly the relationship between the Late Iron Age oppidum, the Roman civitas capital, and its wider rural hinterland.

The University of Reading leads the Silchester Environs Project, which uses geophysical survey, aerial photography and lidar to investigate the wider archaeological landscape surrounding the Roman town. The project has identified several hundred previously unrecorded archaeological sites spanning from the Neolithic period through to the modern era, significantly expanding the known archaeological record of the area.

Historic England has also undertaken extensive survey work across Silchester and surrounding parishes, including geophysical survey and analytical earthwork recording. These studies have refined understanding of the Roman town plan, its hinterland, and earlier and later landscape features.

=== Iron Age and Roman town ===
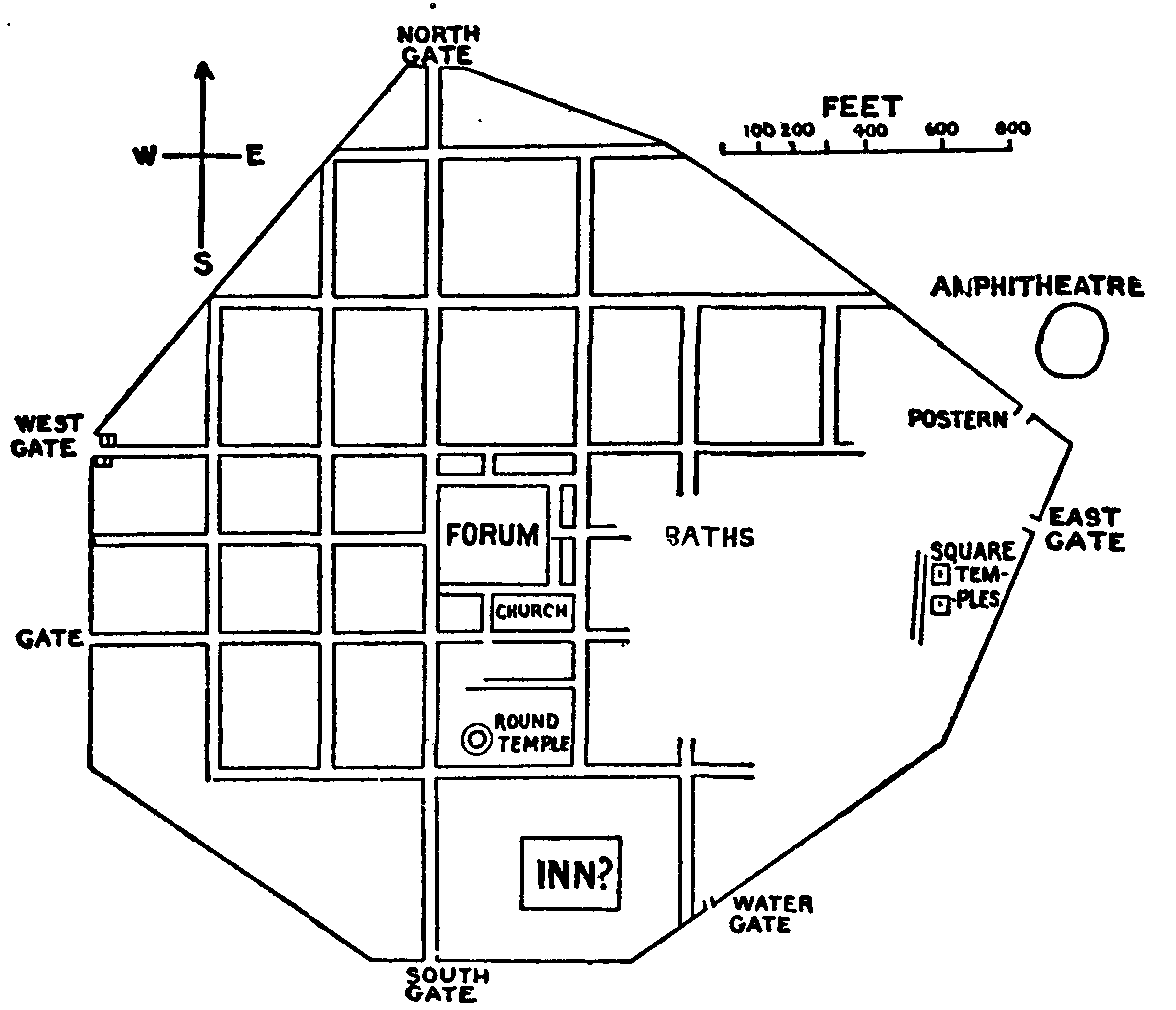
Site plan

Calleva Atrebatum was an Iron Age oppidum which developed into a Roman town in the province of Britannia, serving as the civitas capital of the Atrebates tribe. The remains lie beneath and to the west of the parish church, which stands just inside the Roman town walls and about 1 mile (1.6 km) east of the modern village.

The site encloses an area of over 107 acres (43 ha) within a polygonal earthwork circuit. Substantial portions of the Roman walls survive, along with the town’s street grid preserved as cropmarks and below-ground archaeology. The amphitheatre, added around AD 70–80 and located outside the walls, remains clearly visible. The interior is now largely agricultural land with no standing Roman structures apart from the church and former manor site.

Silchester has been a focus of antiquarian and archaeological interest since the 16th century. Major systematic excavations were carried out between 1890 and 1909 by the Society of Antiquaries under George E. Fox and W. H. St John Hope, establishing the basic plan of the Roman town.

Notable finds include the bronze Silchester eagle, discovered in the basilica in 1866 and now displayed in Reading Museum, and the Silchester Ogham stone, dating to around AD 500 and one of the few ogham inscriptions known from England. The stone bears a Latin-alphabet inscription in Irish, apparently naming an individual called Tebicatos, whose identity remains uncertain.

Environmental analysis indicates that inhabitants consumed typical Romano-British crops such as cereals and herbs including coriander, alongside imported fruits such as medlar and mulberry, reflecting integration into wider imperial trade networks.

Occupation of the site appears to have continued into the post-Roman period, with final abandonment in the 7th century, later than many comparable Roman towns in Britain.

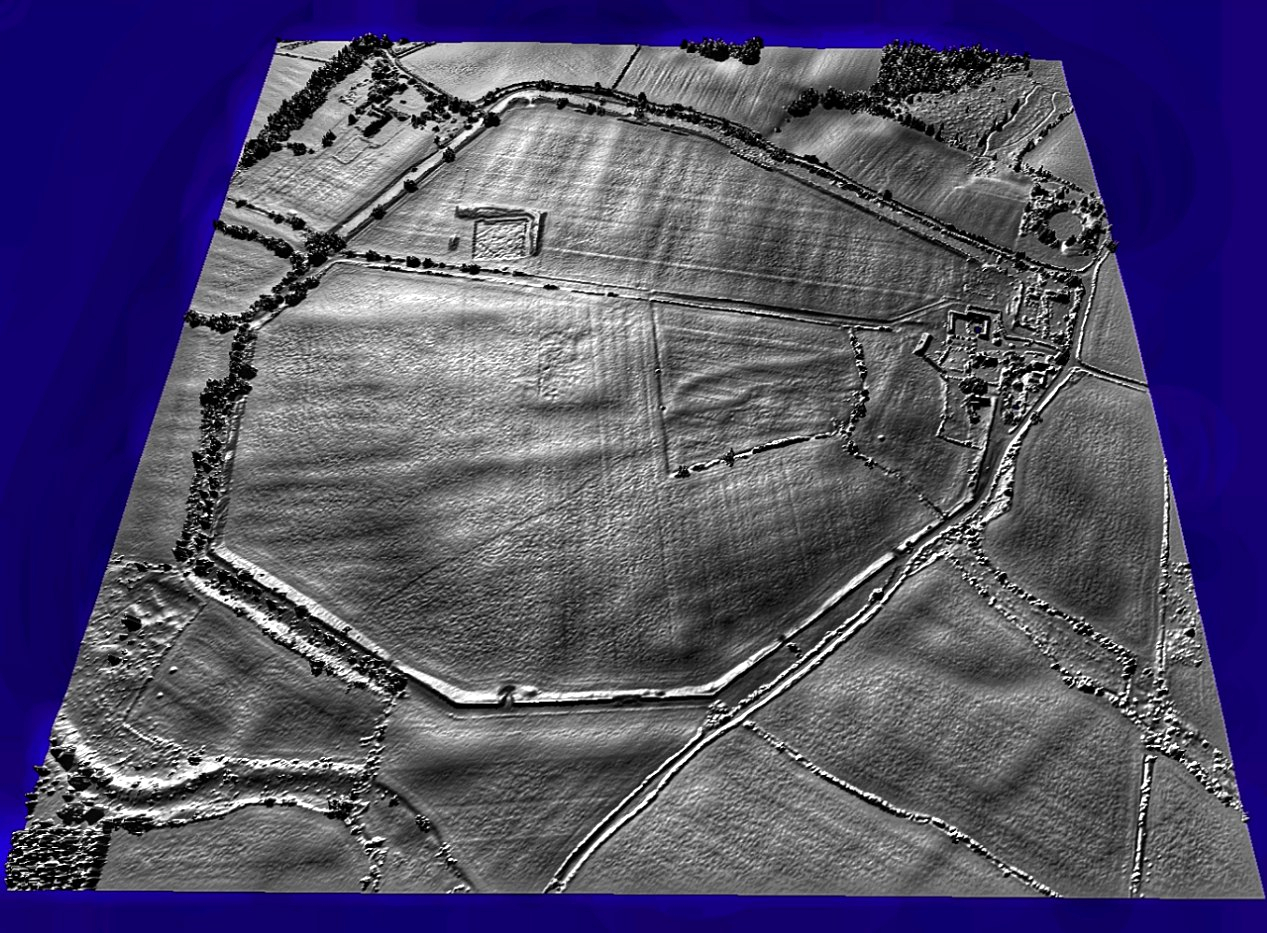
A lidar view of Roman Silchester.

== Geography ==
Silchester is situated in north-east Hampshire, close to the county boundary with Berkshire, in a predominantly rural landscape of farmland, woodland, and lowland heath. The parish lies on gently undulating terrain with light, sandy soils typical of the region.

The present village is centred on Silchester Common, an area of open heathland and woodland. Settlement is dispersed, with housing mainly clustered around the common and along minor rural lanes. The village lies approximately 5 miles (8 km) north of Basingstoke and 9 miles (14 km) south-west of Reading.

Silchester lies within a wider rural–urban fringe between north Hampshire and west Berkshire. The nearby settlements of Tadley and Mortimer act as local service centres for the surrounding villages. Tadley, to the south-east, is the nearest town, while Mortimer, to the north-east, provides additional services and rail access within the Reading–Basingstoke corridor.

The built form of the village is predominantly detached and semi-detached housing at low density, reflecting its rural character and limited expansion beyond the core settlement around the common.

Much of the village is designated as a conservation area, reflecting its rural character, historic landscape setting, and relationship to the adjacent archaeological site of Calleva Atrebatum. Planning controls are intended to preserve the character and appearance of the village and its surroundings.

The parish contains the extensive earthworks of the Roman town of Calleva Atrebatum, which lie immediately to the east of the modern village. The surviving town walls enclose an open landscape of fields and archaeological remains, forming a distinct contrast with the dispersed modern settlement.

The wider parish landscape includes commons, woodland, and farmland, which contribute to its relatively secluded rural setting within north Hampshire.

== Demography ==
=== Population ===
The 2021 Census recorded a population of 1,079 for the civil parish of Silchester, including Little London.

At the 2011 Census, the population was 921.

Overall, the parish has experienced modest population growth in the early 21st century.

=== Age structure ===
At the 2021 Census, Silchester had an older age profile than the national average, with a higher proportion of residents aged 45 and over and a lower proportion aged 16–29, consistent with rural settlements in south-east England.

=== Economic activity ===
At the 2021 Census, the majority of economically active residents were in employment, with a notable proportion recorded as self-employed.

Occupational structure was primarily concentrated in professional, managerial and skilled trades occupations, reflecting the parish’s position within the wider commuter belt of north Hampshire and Berkshire.

=== Housing ===
Housing in Silchester is predominantly detached and semi-detached, with a low-density settlement pattern typical of rural villages in the region.

Levels of home ownership are high compared with national averages, with most households either owning outright or with a mortgage.

== Local government ==
Silchester is a civil parish with an elected parish council.

For local government purposes, the parish forms part of the ward of Pamber and Silchester, within the district of Basingstoke and Deane and the county of Hampshire.

Local government responsibilities are shared between Silchester Parish Council, Basingstoke and Deane Borough Council, and Hampshire County Council.

The ward returns two councillors to Basingstoke and Deane Borough Council.

The parish had a population of 1,079 at the 2021 census and 921 at the 2011 census, reflecting its small scale within the administrative structure of the district.

== Transport ==
Silchester is served by bus route 14, operated by Stagecoach, providing links to Basingstoke, Chineham Shopping Centre, Bramley, Little London, and Tadley. The service operates Monday to Saturday.

The nearest railway stations are Bramley railway station and Mortimer railway station, both on the Reading–Basingstoke line, providing local services towards Reading and Basingstoke. Mainline services are available from Basingstoke railway station and Reading railway station.

The village is accessed via minor rural roads connecting to the A340 and A33, linking onwards to the M3 and M4 motorway corridors.

== Amenities ==
Silchester has a small range of local amenities and community organisations centred on village life.

The village pub is the Calleva Arms, named after the nearby Roman town of Calleva Atrebatum. It was formerly known as "The Crown".

Community life in the parish is supported by local organisations. The Silchester Association is a long-established village community group which organises local events and supports social and civic activities within the parish.

The Calleva Society was formed by local residents during a planning dispute concerning a proposed traveller site near Silchester, acting as a residents’ group in opposition to the proposal during the planning process.

The village hosts a number of annual events including a beer festival, fun run, church fete, and music festival. It also has an amateur dramatic society and a cricket club competing in the Hampshire Cricket League.

== Awards ==
Silchester was named "Hampshire Village of the Year" in 2008 and "South of England Village of the Year" in 2009 as part of the Calor Village of the Year competition.

== Notable people ==
Silchester has been associated with a number of individuals in the fields of sport, religion, music, literature and public life.

- Thomas Powys (1747–1800) was an Anglican clergyman.
- James Crowdy (cricketer) (1794–1876) was an English cricketer who played first-class cricket in the early 19th century.
- Richard Carte (1808–1891) was a composer, flautist and instrument maker who contributed to 19th-century British musical life.
- Victoria Monks (1884–1927) was a music hall singer active in the early 20th century.
- Thomas Pakenham (born 1933) is a historian and arborist known for works on military, imperial and natural history.
- Dudley Fishburn (born 1946) is a journalist and former Conservative Member of Parliament.
- Alys Fowler (born 1978) is a gardener, writer and broadcaster known for her work on horticulture and sustainable growing.

== See also ==
- Ring of Silvianus – Roman curse ring discovered near Silchester in 1785, sometimes suggested in popular culture as a possible influence on J. R. R. Tolkien's fictional One Ring
- Silchester eagle – Roman bronze artefact found at Silchester, part of the archaeological finds from Calleva Atrebatum
- Calleva Atrebatum – Roman town located beneath modern Silchester
- Roman Britain – historical context for Silchester’s origins
- List of places in Hampshire – broader geographic context

== Sources and further reading ==
- Aston, Michael; Bond, James (1976). The Landscape of Towns. Archaeology in the Field Series. London: J.M. Dent & Sons Ltd. p. 53. ISBN 0-460-04194-0.
- Fulford, Michael (2021). Silchester Revealed The Iron Age and Roman Town of Calleva. Macclesfield: Windgather Press. ISBN 9781911188865.
- Lodwick, Lisa (2016). "The debatable territory where geology and archaeology meet': reassessing the early archaeobotanical work of Clement Reid and Arthur Lyell at Roman Silchester" (PDF). Environmental Archaeology. 22: 56–78. doi:10.1080/14614103.2015.1116218. S2CID 162420770.
- Page, W.H., ed. (1911). A History of the County of Hampshire, Volume 4. Victoria County History. pp. 51–56.
- Pevsner, Nikolaus; Lloyd, David (1967). Hampshire and the Isle of Wight. The Buildings of England. Harmondsworth: Penguin Books. pp. 503–505.
