= Pie in the Sky (TV series) =

British television series (1994–1997)

- Genre: Cosy mystery; Police procedural; Dramedy
- Written by: Andrew Payne
- Starring: Richard Griffiths; Maggie Steed; Malcolm Sinclair; Bella Enahoro; Joe Duttine; Nicholas Lamont; Nick Raggett; Alison McKenna; Ashley Russell; Samantha Janus; Marsha Thomason
- Country of origin: United Kingdom
- Original language: English
- No. of series: 5
- No. of episodes: 40

Production
- Executive producers: Allan McKeown; Jo Willett
- Producer: Chrissy Skinns
- Production location: United Kingdom
- Running time: 50 minutes
- Production companies: WitzEnd Productions (all series); Nicework Productions (series 3–5)

Original release
- Network: BBC1
- Release: 13 March 1994 – 17 August 1997

Pie in the Sky is a British police comedy drama starring Richard Griffiths and Maggie Steed, created by Andrew Payne and first broadcast in five series on BBC1 between 13 March 1994 and 17 August 1997, as well as being syndicated on other channels in other countries.

The protagonist, Henry Crabbe, while still being an on-duty, "semi-retired" policeman (much against his will), is also the head chef at his wife's restaurant "Pie in the Sky", set in the fictional town of Middleton and county of Westershire.

== Premise ==
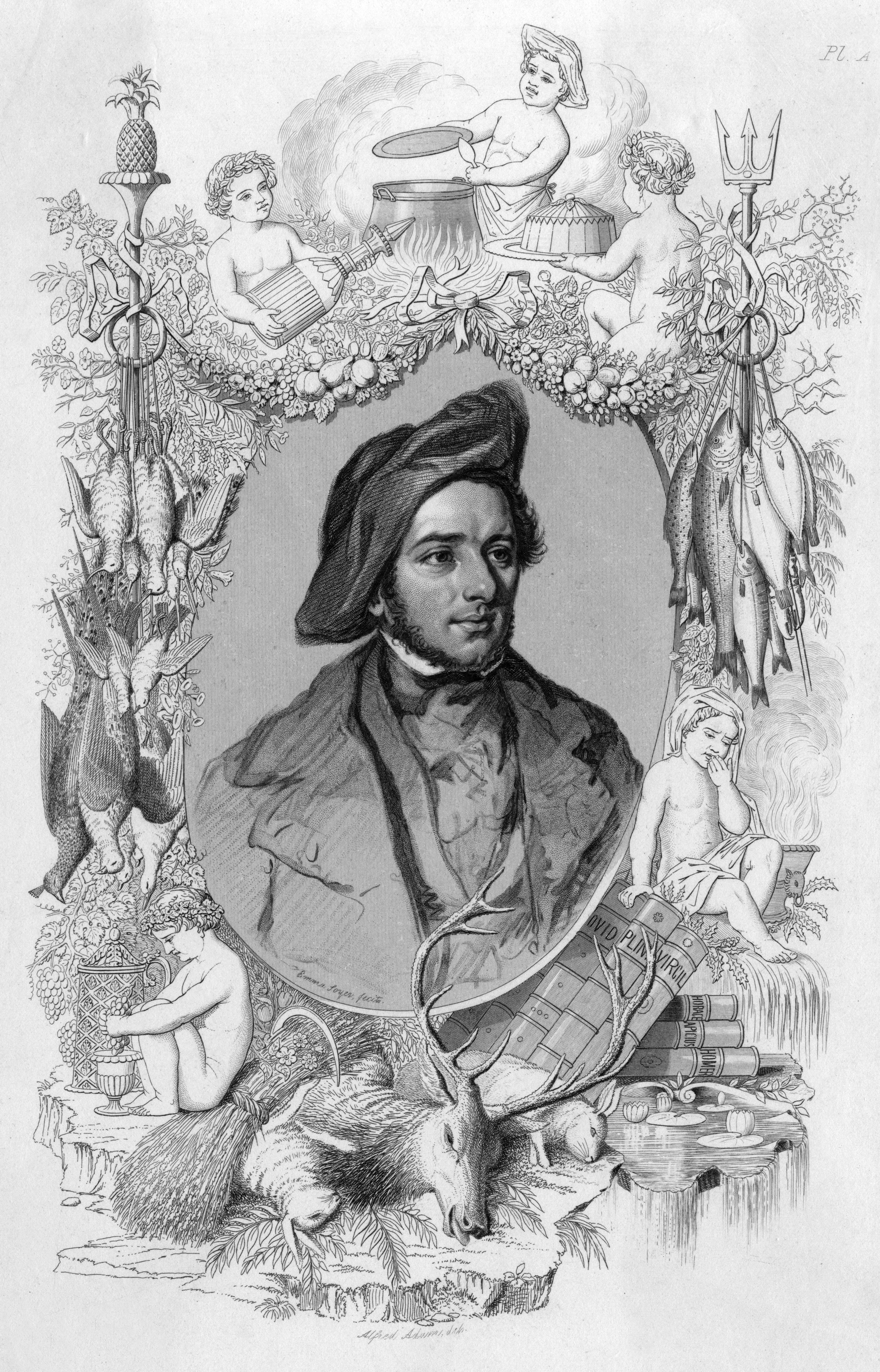
Crabbe's portrait of Alexis Soyer that hung on the wall in his kitchen.

The series focuses on the life of Detective Inspector Henry Crabbe, who serves in the police force for the fictional county of Westershire. After 25 years on the job, Crabbe wishes to retire and set up his own restaurant, and is brought one step closer after an attempt to catch a high-profile criminal backfires, leaving him shot in the leg. His boss, Assistant Chief Constable Freddie Fisher, is unwilling to let Crabbe leave the Westershire force, and so, when a corrupt officer frames Crabbe for taking a bribe, effectively blackmails him into taking on occasional cases when required.

As a result, Crabbe finds his life divided between his duties as a police detective, and a chef in his new restaurant — "Pie in the Sky" — which he runs with his wife Margaret. Each episode thus focuses on two separate plotlines, in which one sees Crabbe investigating a case, while the other sees him, his wife and their staff dealing with a problem that affects their restaurant.

== Cast ==
- Richard Griffiths as DI Henry Crabbe, detective and restaurant owner. He is an astute detective, described by Fisher as a "great details man." Henry is also a lover of food, and a great cook.
- Maggie Steed as Margaret Crabbe, Henry's wife. She is an accountant and cares little for good food herself, but works in the restaurant and supports Henry's venture, as long as it makes a profit.
- Malcolm Sinclair as ACC Freddy Fisher, Assistant Chief Constable of Police, Henry's boss. He is most concerned with furthering his career, but recognises that Crabbe is an excellent detective.
- Bella Enahoro as WPC [Later DS] Sofiya Cambridge, detective (Series 1–4). She is a trustworthy officer who accompanies Crabbe on most cases.
- Mary Woodvine as WPC Jane Morton, police constable (Series 5), accompanies Crabbe on most cases in Series 5.
- Derren Litten as PC Ed Guthrie, police constable (Series 5), accompanies Crabbe on most cases in Series 5.
- Joe Duttine as Steve Turner, chef (Series 1–2). He is an ex-criminal but an honest worker, and a good young chef.
- Nicholas Lamont as Gary Palmer, chef (Series 3–5). Like Steve, he is an ex-criminal, an honest worker and a good young chef.
- Nick Raggett as Leon Henderson, a food supplier for the restaurant, and occasional worker in the restaurant.
- Alison McKenna as Linda Walker, waitress, and girlfriend of Steve (Series 1)
- Ashley Russell as John Dawson, waiter (Series 1–2)
- Samantha Janus as Nicola Dooley, waitress (Series 2–4)
- Marsha Thomason as Sally Nicholls, waitress (Series 5)
- Robert Putt as Chief Constable Braithwaite, Fisher's boss (Recurring; Series 3 and 5)
- Caroline Loncq as Jenny Drabble, police PR officer (Recurring; Series 4–5)
- Michael Kitchen as Dudley Hooperman, a high-class thief who is supposed to be Crabbe's last arrest but instead shoots him in the leg and escapes (Guest; Series 1)

== Episodes ==
=== Series overview ===
Series	Episodes	Originally released	
Series	Episodes	First released	Last released
1	10	13 March 1994	15 May 1994
2	10	15 January 1995	19 March 1995
3	6	31 December 1995	4 February 1996
4	6	15 September 1996	20 October 1996
5	8	29 June 1997	17 August 1997

=== Series 1 (1994) ===
No. overall	No. in series	Title	Directed by	Written by	Original release date
1	1	"The Best of Both Worlds"	Colin Gregg	Andrew Payne	13 March 1994
Henry lets Hooperman escape, and Fisher takes the opportunity to suspend his retirement.
2	2	"The Truth Will Out"	Colin Gregg	Andrew Payne	20 March 1994
A delusional cop seeks to bring Fisher's ally down, and Henry recruits a new waiter.
3	3	"An Innocent Man"	Martin Hutchings	Andrew Payne	27 March 1994
Pie in the Sky becomes the scene of a corruption sting, but Henry acts in favour of his customer.
4	4	"Once a Copper"	George Case	John Flanagan and Andrew McCulloch	3 April 1994
Henry cooks a banquet for a visiting Japanese delegation, and tracks down a criminal from his past, who was presumed dead.
5	5	"A Shot in the Dark"	Colin Gregg	Richard Maher	10 April 1994
A narcotics investigation ends in a bitten hand for Fisher, and Henry finds a new source of escargots.
6	6	"Undesirable Elements"	Colin Gregg	Andrew Payne	17 April 1994
Steve investigates the burglary of Pie in the Sky, while Henry does battle with murderous private sector cops.
7	7	"Passion Fruit Fool"	George Case	Paul Hines	24 April 1994
The girlfriend of Henry's dry cleaner (Jim Carter) is kidnapped by a psychotic ex-lover. Andy Serkis makes an appearance.
8	8	"A Matter of Taste"	Martin Hutchings	Richard Maher	1 May 1994
Henry uncovers two separate wine scams in Middleton. Pete Postlethwaite and Julian Fellowes have cameo roles.
9	9	"Who Only Stand and Wait"	Lawrence Gordon Clark	John Milne	8 May 1994
Henderson's neighbour finds a dismembered corpse, which may prove the innocence of an imprisoned man. A visiting French policewoman Marianne Dupont (fr:Marianne Borgo) gives Crabbe a gift of Alexandre Dumas' Dictionary of Cuisine.
10	10	"Endangered Species"	Lawrence Gordon Clark	Andrew Payne	15 May 1994
Margaret and Henderson side with Reynard the Fox in opposing a new bypass, while Henry must question his loyalties.

=== Series 2 (1995) ===
No. overall	No. in series	Title	Directed by	Written by	Original release date
11	1	"Hard Cheese"	Jim Hill	Andrew Payne	15 January 1995
Henry investigates a prowler fond of older ladies, and begins to suspect the celibate supplier of his cheese.
12	2	"Brown Bread"	Martin Hutchings	Andrew Payne	22 January 1995
A corpse vanishes from the Pie in the Sky's lavatories, and Henry soon finds himself investigating a counterfeit currency.
13	3	"The Policeman's Daughter"	Jim Hill	John Milne	29 January 1995
Fisher's daughter joins a squat on Henderson's field, and Henry is recruited to bring her back.
14	4	"The One That Got Away"	Martin Hutchings	Richard Maher	5 February 1995
The fish farmer's fiancé appears to have been murdered, and it's up to Henry to save his best trout supplier.
15	5	"Dead Right"	Jim Hill	Lizzie Mickery	12 February 1995
Henry becomes entangled with a self-publicising psychic, and together they solve the mystery of a missing girl.
16	6	"Black Pudding"	Danny Hiller	Andrew Payne	19 February 1995
Henry is reunited with his hero, Hillary Smallwood, and becomes embroiled in her nephew's wicked plot.
17	7	"Swan in His Pride"	Lawrence Gordon Clark	John Milne	26 February 1995
Henry goes undercover in Bath to investigate the local constabulary, who are using a serial killer to mask their errors.
18	8	"The Mild Bunch"	Danny Hiller	John Milne	5 March 1995
As two pensioners go on a fraud spree, the inclusion of Dundee marmalade in their trademark pudding motivates Henry to find them.
19	9	"The Mystery of Pikey"	Danny Hiller	John Milne	12 March 1995
Two posh children take advantage of a poor fisherman, and Henderson falls in the river.
20	10	"Lemon Twist"	Lawrence Gordon Clark	Andrew Payne	19 March 1995
Henry goes on a management training course, while Pie in the Sky is mobbed following a glowing review.

=== Series 3 (1995-96) ===
No. overall	No. in series	Title	Directed by	Written by	Original release date
21	1	"Money Talks"	Martin Hutchings	Andrew Payne	31 December 1995
Henry stakes out a pizza parlour. John and Steve have left. A new chef, Gary arrives and helps Henry catch the pizza gang.
22	2	"Game Pie (In the Sky)"	Martin Hutchings	Richard Maher	7 January 1996
Henry caters for his friend's pheasant shoot, where Fisher is among the guests. A member of the estate staff is shot and killed and it looks as if Fisher accidentally shot him.
23	3	"Irish Stew"	Keith Boak	Christina Reid	14 January 1996
An Irishwoman books the restaurant for a wedding banquet for her and her new husband. Byron's briefcase is stolen from his hotel and Henry is suspicious of his reaction.
24	4	"Doggett's Coat and Badge"	Danny Hiller	John Milne	21 January 1996
Charles Rider, a wine-loving regular at Pie in the Sky, is being threatened, and comes to Crabbe for help.
25	5	"This Other Eden"	David Innes Edwards	Matthew Leys	28 January 1996
Henry investigates thefts of valuable plants from gardens, while Margaret unknowingly employs the chief suspect.
26	6	"Coddled Eggs"	David Innes Edwards	John Milne	4 February 1996
While recovering stolen cars, Henry apprehends a larger smuggling ring headed by two Russians.

=== Series 4 (1996) ===
No. overall	No. in series	Title	Directed by	Written by	Original release date
27	1	"Devils on Horseback - Part 1"	Malcolm Mowbray	Richard Maher	15 September 1996
Henry and Margaret spend a day at the races with her new client Bob Bishop. The corpse of stable lad Ben Tucker is found in a horse-box. Keeley Hawes appears in an early part.
28	2	"Devils on Horseback - Part 2"	Malcolm Mowbray	Richard Maher	22 September 1996
Margaret stumbles on the killer. Meanwhile Nicola is annoyed when a school friend appears to be making a play for Gary.
29	3	"Chinese Whispers"	Bill Pryde	Andrew Payne	29 September 1996
The Chen family's Chinese takeaway is the target of an arson attack, but Mr. Chen will not go to the police. His daughter Mei asks Henry for help.
30	4	"New Leaf"	Keith Boak	Robert Jones	6 October 1996
Henry must guard a safe house protecting an uncooperative star witness. He eventually wins her over with his cooking.
31	5	"Breaking Bread"	Paul Harrison	Robert Jones	13 October 1996
To save money, Fisher employs a new company to supply the police canteen. Arrests go down and Fisher relies on Henry to find a reason to get rid of the new company.
32	6	"Gary's Cake"	Bill Pryde	Andrew Payne	20 October 1996
When the restaurant is robbed, Henry closes down to do his own investigation, solving the crime in time to mark two years of Gary giving up alcohol with a celebratory cake. Guest stars Steven Hartley

=== Series 5 (1997) ===
No. overall	No. in series	Title	Directed by	Written by	Original release date
33	1	"Squashed Tomatoes"	Bill Pryde	Andrew Payne	29 June 1997
Cambridge is gone and Henry is saddled with two new staff members. At the restaurant, Nicola has left and Gary is unhappy.
34	2	"Ugly Customers"	Simon Massey	Niall Leonard	6 July 1997
Henry's team goes to the garish Luxor Hotel to protect a jury. Back at the restaurant Sally learns to get the better of a sex pest.
35	3	"Pork Pies"	David Innes Edwards	John Milne	13 July 1997
Henry and the squad go to a meat factory where animal rights protesters are demonstrating against the owner. Henry finds the sausages contain soya and are wholly meat-free.
36	4	"Cutting the Mustard"	David Innes Edwards	Robert Jones	20 July 1997
Henry is called to a school where a student has been beaten up by local youths. Henry finds a member of the Chemistry Department staff selling Ecstasy tablets.
37	5	"Return Match"	Rob Evans	Robert Jones	27 July 1997
Henry has to solve a series of thefts from lorries and gets unexpected help from private security firm Troubleshooters. Guest stars Bruce Byron and Mark Womack
38	6	"The Apprentice"	Morag Fullarton	Ann Marie Di Mambro	3 August 1997
Nicky comes to Pie in the Sky, claiming he is there for work experience. Henry uses him in the kitchen and he impresses everyone. The till is robbed and Nicky goes missing. Guest stars Kelly Reilly
39	7	"In the Smoke"	David Innes Edwards	Andrew Payne	10 August 1997
The Crabbes holiday in London. Henry discovers a friend in hiding, while Margaret finds a body in the trash. Guest stars Nicola Walker and Michael Attwell
40	8	"Smelling of Roses"	Rob Evans	Andrew Payne	17 August 1997
Henry loses his sense of smell and mysteriously regains it when he resigns from the police once and for all. Guest stars John Bowler and Anthony O'Donnell

== Filming locations ==
Westershire, the fictional county where the series is set, is based on Berkshire in southern England. Although scenes in Middleton were often filmed in Marlow in Buckinghamshire, the exterior of the restaurant, Pie in the Sky, was filmed outside number 64 High Street in the Old Town in Hemel Hempstead, Hertfordshire. Originally, a florist and then a toy shop, the building became a minor tourist attraction while the series ran, then housed the business of a dolls’-house maker, and as of 2019, a hair salon. A nearby restaurant at 80 High Street renamed itself "Pie in the Sky" to capitalise on the programme's popularity (later becoming "Les Amants").

In Olinda, Victoria in Australia, a restaurant called "Pie in the Sky" also serves many of the TV series' recipes and especially its famous crusty steak and kidney pies.

All internal filming at the restaurant was carried out at Bray Studios at Water Oakley, near Windsor in Berkshire. The local newspaper, the Maidenhead Advertiser, occasionally appears in the series redubbed the 'Barstock and Middleton Advertiser'. Freddie Fisher plays golf at Stoke Park Golf Club at Stoke Poges.

=== Series 1 ===
Both the exterior and interior of the 'Nebditch Intercontinental Hotel' which features throughout episode 2 of the 1st series, "The Truth Will Out", was filmed at John Nike's Coppid Beech Hotel in Binfield, near Bracknell in Berkshire.

In episode 3 of the 1st series, "An Innocent Man", railway enthusiast Duncan Spellar lives at Brocket Hall at Lemsford in Hertfordshire. In the opening scene, Julian Tubbs MP is shown dining on the terrace at the 'Compleat Angler' at Bisham in East Berkshire, overlooking Marlow Church on the other side of the River Thames. Later Crabbe follows him to 'Middleton Station' which was filmed at Horsley railway station in Surrey.

In episode 4 of the 1st series, "Once a Copper", the opening scene was filmed at Shirburn Castle. Barstock University is Bracknell College. Cambridge meets with an officer from a former investigation in Bracknell - the 3M Building can be seen out of the window. The 'Thin Blue Line' Conference takes place at Oakley Court, adjoining Bray Studios. Henry confronts a supposedly dead criminal at Windsor Racecourse and is later shown hurrying to the Japanese Reception across Marlow Bridge.

In episode 5 of the 1st series, "A Shot in the Dark", the deceased works at White Waltham Airfield while his home is a cottage in Waltham St Lawrence both in East Berkshire.

=== Series 2 ===
In episode 1 of the 2nd series, "Hard Cheese", the 'Laxton Grange Hotel' was filmed at Oakley Court, adjoining Bray Studios in Berkshire. The local cheese-merchant confesses his indiscretions to Henry in the garden at the Flower Pot Hotel at Aston near Remenham, also in Berkshire. Henry and Cambridge examine a large map at one point which reveals other locations in Berkshire: Henry's home town of 'Middleton' is a non-existent town located at Waltham St Lawrence; 'Laxton' is broadly based on the town of Bracknell, though actually located at nearby Warfield; 'Brayfield' is broadly based on Maidenhead, being located at Braywick on the town's southern edge; adjoining this is 'Sommersby' based on Twyford relocated to Woolley Green.

In episode 5 of the 2nd series, "Dead Right", Henry has a picnic with the psychic down by the River Thames in the churchyard at Bisham in East Berkshire.

Episode 7 of the 2nd series, "Swan in His Pride", is set in the city of Bath in Somerset which features throughout. Crabbe and Fisher catch the train to Bath from Reading railway station in Berkshire.

In episode 9 of the 2nd series, "The Mystery of Pikey", the bikers rally in front of Warfield Church, near Bracknell, in Berkshire; while the tyres of a number of cars are slashed at Baileys Garage in Maiden's Green, part of the neighbouring parish of Winkfield. The Anchor public house at Wisley, near Woking, in Surrey features throughout the episode.

=== Series 3 ===
In episode 4, "Doggett's Coat and Badge", Doggett is seen purchasing a Bow Street Runner figurine in a shop in Windsor in Berkshire.

In episode 6, "Coddled Eggs", Crabbe and Fisher are seen entering their police station. This was filmed at what was then the Mercury Rev (as of 2016, the Honda UK Building) in Cain Road in Binfield, also in Berkshire. The railway station where Crabbe mans the anti-crime trailer is Taplow between Maidenhead and Slough.

=== Series 4 ===
In episodes 1 & 2 of the 4th series, "Devils on Horseback," the cider brewery is filmed at Stanlake Park near Twyford in Berkshire. The Horse and Jockey public house is The Greyhound at Aldbury, Hertfordshire.

In episode 5 of the 4th series, "Breaking Bread," Crabbe and Cambridge go to the council estates department to examine building plans. The offices are Easthampstead Park, near Bracknell.

=== Series 5 ===
The eponymous restaurant goes through a re-design, with the previous light décor being changed to a darker terracotta and the whole bar area being moved from being adjacent to the kitchen doors to the right-hand window bay. In episode 2 of the 5th series, "Ugly Customers," Crabbe goes to examine the home of the foreman of the jury. He visits a small country house which is the 'Pump Room' at Winkfield Plain, near Windsor, in Berkshire.

In episode 4, "Cutting the Mustard", the school featured was the Masonic Senior School (later the International University) in Bushey, Herts. In Episode 5, "Return Match", the football scenes are filmed at non league Basingstoke Town FC

== Broadcast, DVD and streaming ==
The series was originally broadcast in the UK on BBC1 between 13 March 1994 and 17 August 1997.

In Australia, it was originally broadcast on the Australian Broadcasting Corporation. In 2021, it was broadcast on 7two and streamed on 7plus.

The entire series is available on DVD in the UK.

In the United States, Acorn Media has released separate sets of all five series on 12 May 2009 (Series 1), 26 January 2010 (Series 2), 7 September 2010 (Series 3), 25 January 2011 (Series 4) and 2 August 2011 (Series 5). The complete series was released on DVD by Acorn Media on 11 November 2011.

The entire series is available for streaming through several streaming services including AcornTV and BritBox.

In Australia, Via Vision Entertainment have released series 1 & 2 on 21 July 2021 and will release series 3–5 on 15 September 2021.

All episodes are currently available to watch in the UK via the UKTV Play platform.

All five seasons became available in the US on BritBox in March 2023.
