= Chavey Down =

Hamlet in Berkshire, England

Coordinates: 51.418246°N 0.709245°W

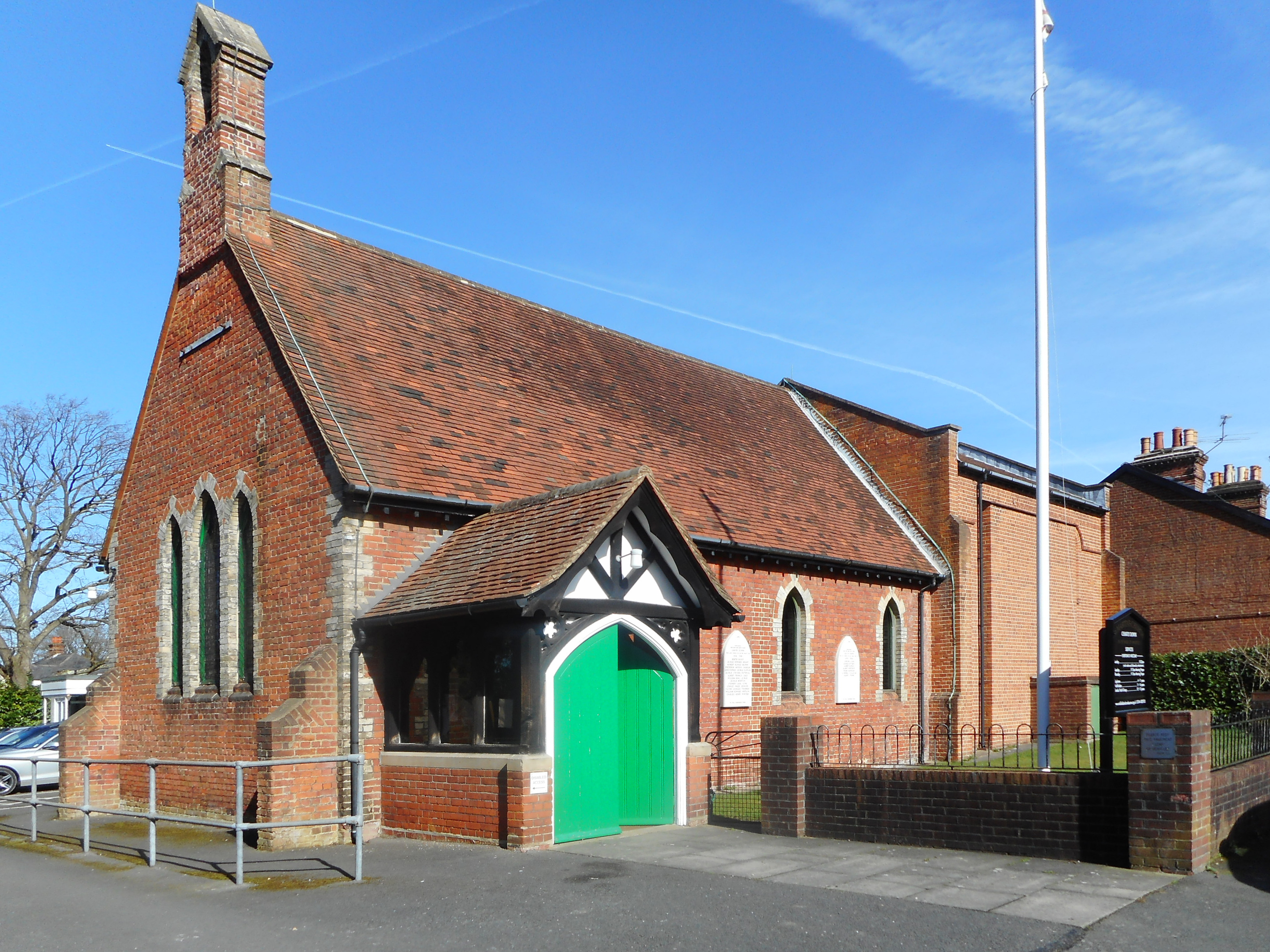
- St Martin's Church

- Location within Berkshire
- OS grid reference: SU894698
- Metropolitan borough: Bracknell Forest
- Metropolitan county: Berkshire
- Region: South East
- Country: England
- Sovereign state: United Kingdom
- Post town: Ascot
- Postcode district: SL5
- Dialling code: 01344
- Police: Thames Valley
- Fire: Royal Berkshire
- Ambulance: South Central
- UK Parliament: Maidenhead

Chavey Down is a hamlet partly in Ascot, Berkshire, England, and part of the civil parish of Winkfield. The settlement lies near to the A329 road, and is situated approximately 1 mile (1.6 km) west of Ascot Racecourse. It is located within the borough of Bracknell Forest and lies south-west of Windsor.

Chavey Down village predominantly lies between Priory Road and Longhill Road where the two roads join at the top of the village at the beginning of Locks Ride. In between the two roads are Church Road and North Road, consisting mainly of houses dating from the late 19th and early 20th century. The land in between the two roads, which now consists of the house's gardens is called Spike Island. This name apparently goes back a few hundred years.

The Sand Pit: At the junction of Priory and Longhill Roads lies the remnants of a large sand pit. The whole area is built on sand and on the other of the A329 London Road, Englemere Pond and Swinley Forest are large areas of sand based woodland and forest. The sand pit was active for many years in the 19th and 20th centuries but closed in the early 1960s. As the pit was so deep the lorries that used to move the sand around were left buried when it was filled in because it was not economical to extricate them.
