= Britwell =

Housing estate in Slough, Berkshire, England

Coordinates: 51.5337°N 0.6238°W

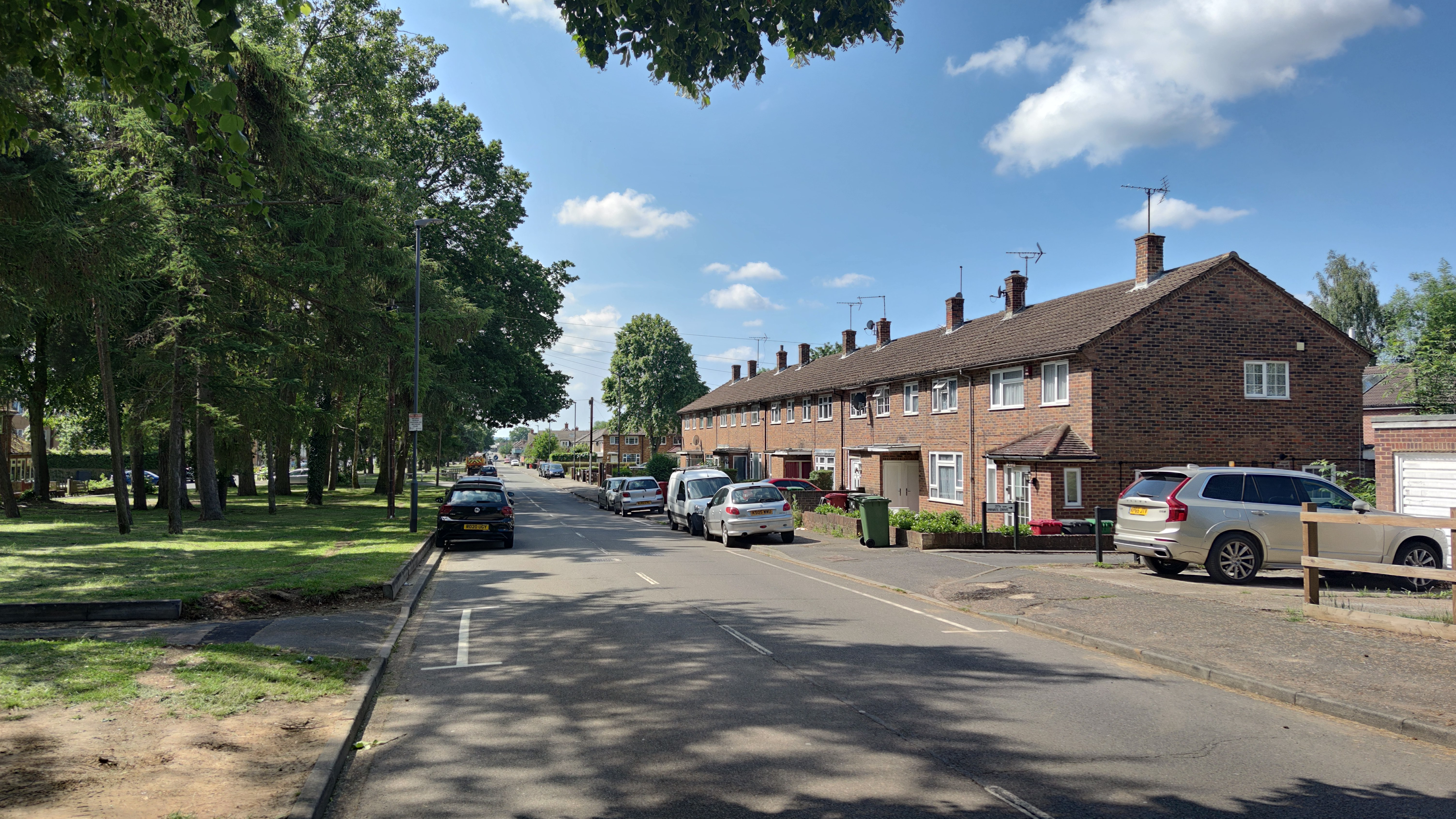
- Wentworth Avenue, Britwell

- Location within Berkshire
- Population: 5,989 (2001)
- OS grid reference: SU955825
- Civil parish: Britwell
- Unitary authority: Slough
- Ceremonial county: Berkshire
- Region: South East
- Country: England
- Sovereign state: United Kingdom
- Post town: Slough
- Postcode district: SL2
- Dialling code: 01753
- Police: Thames Valley
- Fire: Royal Berkshire
- Ambulance: South Central
- UK Parliament: Slough

Britwell is a residential housing estate and civil parish in the north west of Slough, Berkshire, South East England. It is about 23 miles (37 km) west of Charing Cross, the centremost point of London.

The name Britwell derives from the old English beorhtan wiellan meaning 'bright, clear well'.

== History ==
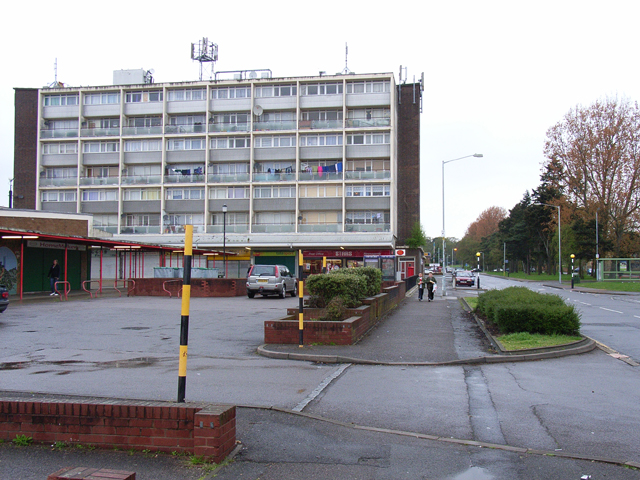
Shops and flats at the run-down heart of the Britwell estate in 2006. The buildings have since been demolished and replaced by low-rise housing.

The place now known as the Britwell Estate was originally farm land. Modern-day Britwell, which has the well-defined geographic boundaries of Farnham Lane (in the north), Lower Britwell Road and Haymill Road (to the west), Whittaker Road and Northborough Road (south) and Long Readings Lane (east), was created as a large overspill housing estate for bombed-out Londoners at the end of the Second World War. Britwell was one of a number of London County Council estates built at the time, with other estates in places including Langley and Swindon. The first of 11,000 tenants arrived in August 1956 and were delighted with the "roomy and modern" houses, complete with large swivel windows – "a boon to housewives". There was a dearth of amenities at first, but after the founding of the community association in 1959, the estate finally got a bus service into Slough, and a community centre in 1966.

When the Britwell Estate was created, its postal address was Farnham Royal, near Slough. The local authority at the time was Eton Rural District Council in the county of Buckinghamshire.

In 1965, the London County Council was one of a number of authorities replaced by the Greater London Council (GLC). When the GLC was in turn abolished in 1986, the social housing on Britwell was transferred to Slough Borough Council. Mortgages issued by the GLC authority were transferred to the Royal Borough of Kingston upon Thames.

== Government ==
Following the Local Government Act 1972, Britwell was transferred to Berkshire, to form part of the borough of Slough. A civil parish was established at that point for the part of the estate that had previously lain in the Burnham civil parish. The current Parish Council had 13 parish councillors and covers approximately 60% of the Britwell Estate.

The Britwell Electoral ward included the parish area and extends westwards to the Five Points crossroads in Burnham. It has three borough councillors. The southern part of Long Readings Lane and the south side of Cowper Road became part of the Britwell ward for the first time in 2004 following a Boundary Commission review.

The Parish Council have provided premises for use as a Neighbourhood Police Office within their parish ground; this is well used by the local beat team, PCSOs and community wardens.

In 2018 the parish, and neighbouring Wexham Court, were scheduled for abolition in April 2019, but after an appeal by the parish councils and a judicial review the order was quashed and the parishes remain unchanged.

== Geography ==
Britwell has two Local nature reserves, the first is on the South Western border of the village called Haymill Valley, and the other is on the northern border called Cocksherd Wood.

== In the media ==
Britwell's row of shops featured as a backdrop in the dystopia themed movie V for Vendetta. Britwell has also featured in the ITV drama Torn. The shops also represented 1970s Belfast in the film Titanic Town starring Julie Walters.
