= Prince Philip Trust Fund =

Grant making organisation

- Formation: 1977; 49 years ago
- Founder: Prince Philip, Duke of Edinburgh; Sir Christopher Aston
- Type: Non-profit organisation
- Purpose: Improving community life through local grants
- Location(s): 2 Eton Riverside 39-55 King Stable Street Eton, Windsor, Berkshire SL4 6SA
- Region served: United Kingdom
- Key people: Prince Edward, Duke of Edinburgh (chairman)
- Website: theprincephiliptrustfund.org

The Prince Philip Trust Fund is a United Kingdom-based charitable organisation founded in 1977 by Prince Philip, Duke of Edinburgh following an initiative by the mayor of the Royal Borough of Windsor and Maidenhead, Sir Christopher Aston.

== History ==
The fund was established in 1977 and is registered as a charity. Its charitable objects, as set out in its governing document, are to provide recreational and leisure facilities for residents of the Royal Borough of Windsor and Maidenhead with the aim of improving their conditions of life; to advance the education of young people (especially through voluntary service); and to advance public education in the arts, literature and science within that same area. According to its website, by 2025 the trust had supported over 2,000 projects and distributed almost £2.5 million in grants since its inception. In the financial year ending 30 April 2024, the trust reported an income of £136,287 and expenditure of £174,524. None of its trustees receive remuneration from the charity.

The Maidenhead Advertiser reported that in November 2021 the trust awarded over £90,000 in grant funding to about 35 different projects in the borough, supporting a range of causes—from organisations helping the elderly (such as Age Concern and Men's Matters) and youth‑oriented programmes (Kidscape, ABC to Read), to clubs promoting sport and arts (Boyne Hill Cricket Club, Maidenhead Sea Cadets, Norden Farm). Later, in December 2022 the trust announced another round of funding—£60,000 awarded to 36 charities, projects and individuals, bringing the total distribution for the year to about £110,000.
