= Fifield, Berkshire =

Coordinates: 51°29′03″N 0°41′38″W

Fifield
- Village
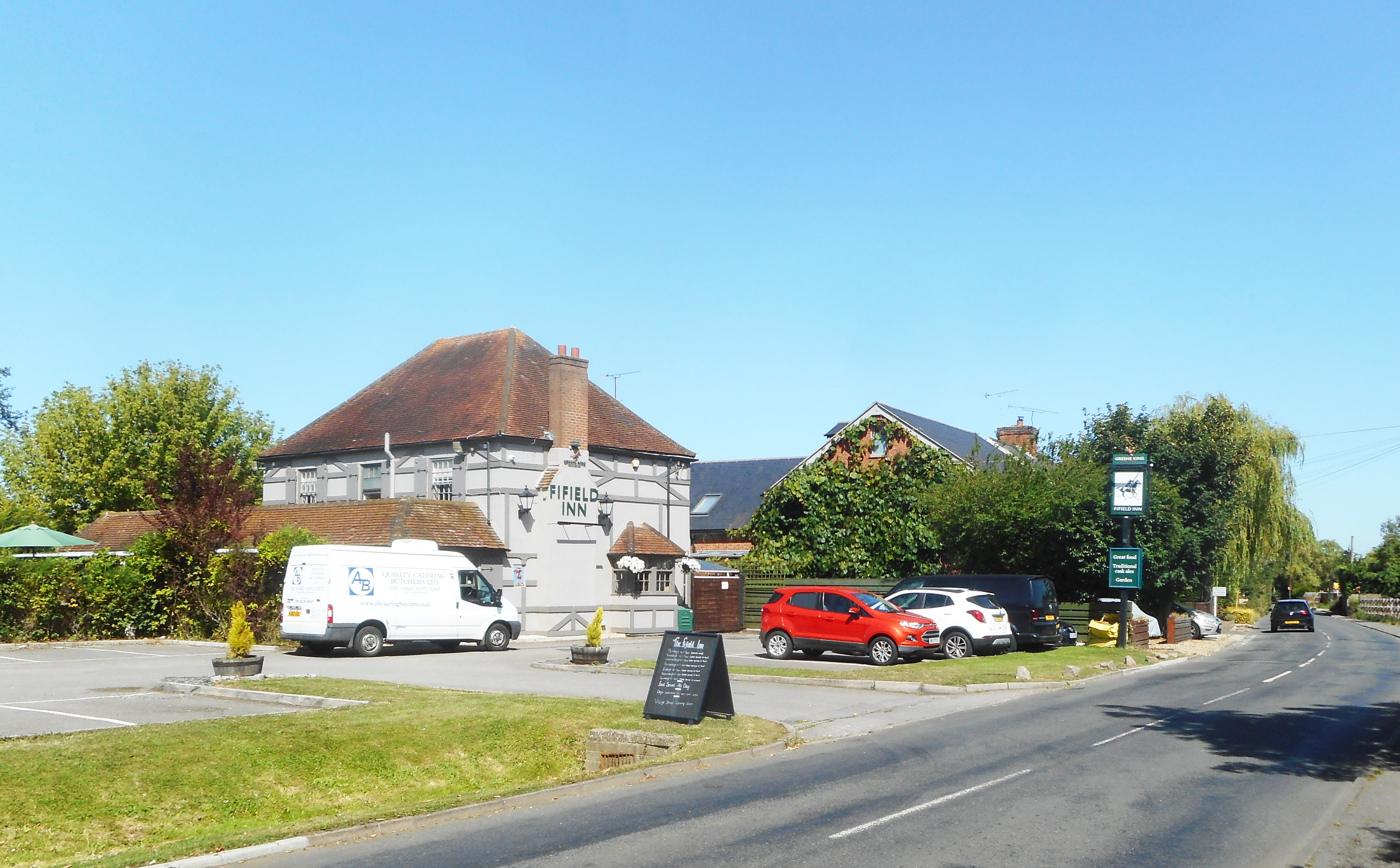
- The Fifield Inn

- Location within Berkshire
- Population: 1,000
- OS grid reference: SU908768
- Unitary authority: Windsor and Maidenhead
- Ceremonial county: Berkshire
- Region: South East
- Country: England
- Sovereign state: United Kingdom
- Post town: WINDSOR
- Postcode district: SL4
- Post town: MAIDENHEAD
- Postcode district: SL6
- Dialling code: 01628
- Police: Thames Valley
- Fire: Royal Berkshire
- Ambulance: South Central
- UK Parliament: Maidenhead

Fifield is a village in the civil parish of Bray in Berkshire in south east England. The settlement lies near the junction of the M4 and A404(M) motorways, and is situated approximately 3 miles (4.8 km) from Maidenhead (to the north) and Windsor (to the east). The local pub is the Fifield Inn, which was refurbished in 2014.

== Etymology ==
The name Fifield is from the Old English fīf + hīd, meaning '(estate of) five hides of land'.

== Notable residents ==
- William Norreys of Fifield House (1523–1591), Usher of the Black Rod.
- Sir John Norreys of Fifield House (1547?–1612), son of the above and High Sheriff of Berkshire.

== Transport ==
The Courtney Buses 16A route passes through the village as do some school buses.
