= Maiden's Green =

Village in Berkshire, England

Coordinates: 51.444°N 0.712°W

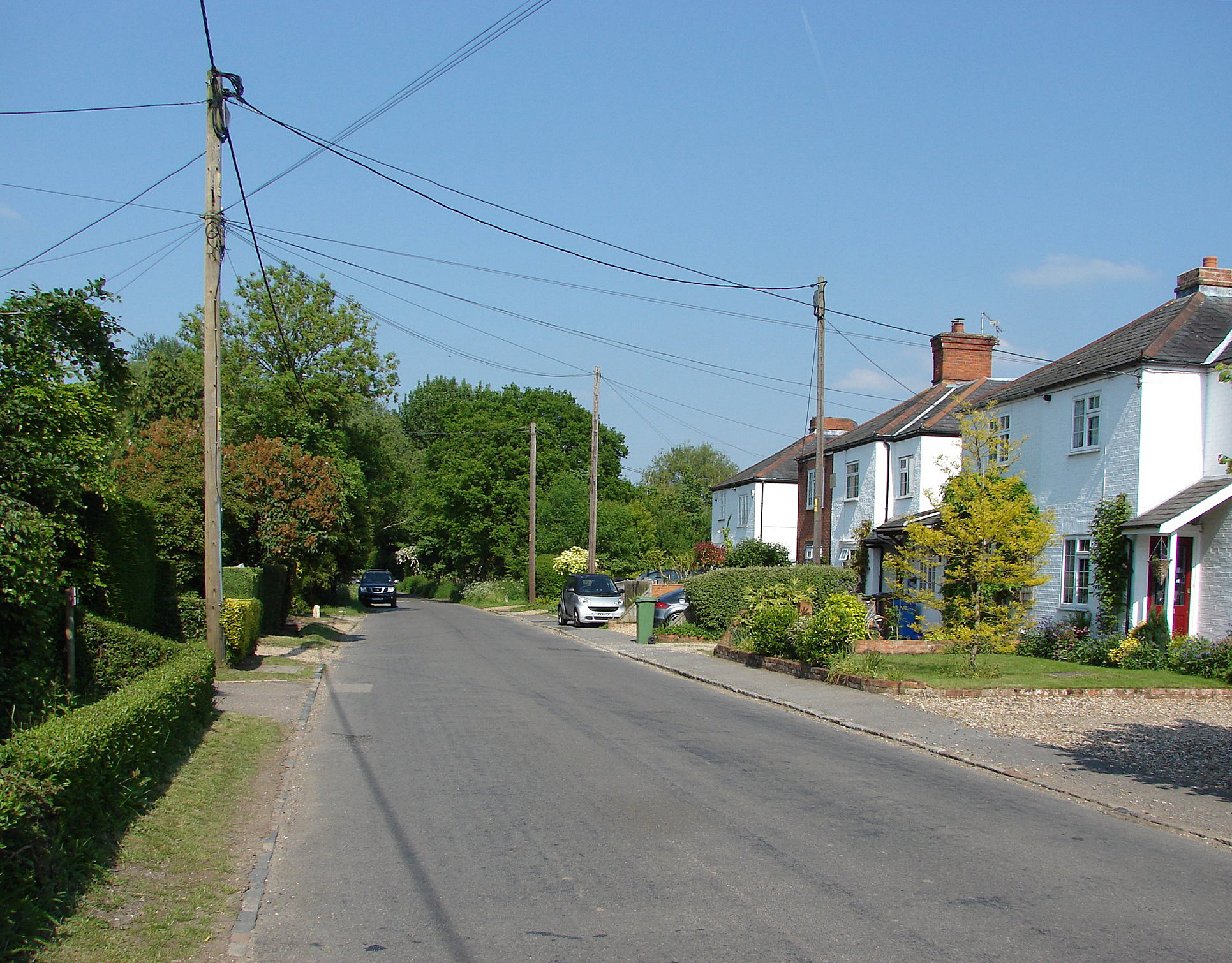
- Maiden's Green

- Location within Berkshire
- OS grid reference: SU896724
- Civil parish: Winkfield
- Unitary authority: Bracknell Forest
- Shire county: Berkshire
- Region: South East
- Country: England
- Sovereign state: United Kingdom
- Post town: WINDSOR
- Postcode district: SL4
- Dialling code: 01344
- Police: Thames Valley
- Fire: Royal Berkshire
- Ambulance: South Central
- UK Parliament: Maidenhead

Maiden's Green or Maidens Green is a small village in Berkshire, England, in the civil parish of Winkfield.

== Geography ==
The settlement lies near to the A330 road, and is approximately 2.5 miles (4.0 km) north-east of Bracknell. Maiden's Green has a site of Special Scientific Interest (SSSI) just to the north of the village, called Chawridge Bourne, which includes a nature reserve called Chawridge Bank.

== Notable buildings ==
Just north of the village, on the Drift Road, stands New Lodge, built in 1857 for Sylvain Van de Weyer, the Belgian ambassador to the United Kingdom.
