= Woodside, Berkshire (hamlet) =

Hamlet in Berkshire, England

Coordinates: 51.433777°N 0.660249°W

Woodside
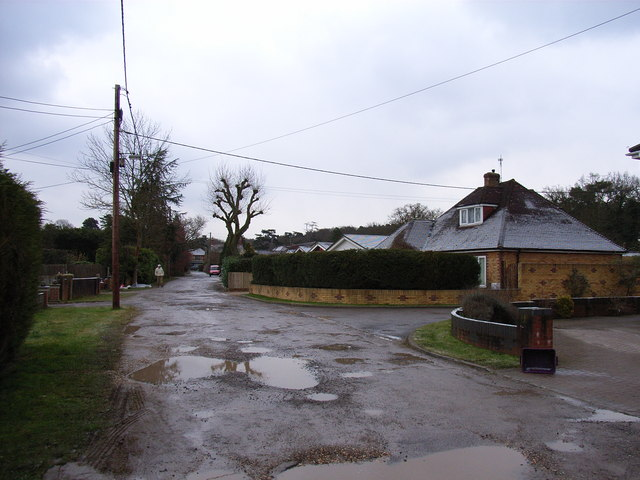
- Kiln Lane, Woodside, in 2006

- Location within Berkshire
- Area: 0.2625 km^{2} (0.1014 sq mi)
- Population: 500 (2021 Census)
  - Density: 1,905/km^{2} (4,930/sq mi)
- OS grid reference: SU930715
- Unitary authority: Bracknell Forest; Royal Borough of Windsor and Maidenhead
- Shire county: Berkshire
- Region: South East
- Country: England
- Sovereign state: United Kingdom
- Post town: Windsor
- Postcode district: SL4
- Dialling code: 01344
- Police: Thames Valley
- Fire: Royal Berkshire
- Ambulance: South Central
- UK Parliament: Maidenhead

Woodside is a hamlet in Berkshire, England, within the civil parishes of Winkfield and Sunninghill and Ascot in the boroughs of Bracknell Forest and Windsor and Maidenhead. The settlement lies near to the A332 road and is approximately 1.5 miles (2.4 km) north-east of Ascot Racecourse and largely surrounded by Windsor Great Park.

In the early Twentieth Century the south of the hamlet was the site of the Ascot Brick Works. It has two pubs The Rose and Crown and the Duke of Edinburgh but no shops or church, as such it is probably best described as a hamlet and not a village. It features several historic houses and buildings (mostly in the northern part of the hamlet). In the 19th and early 20th Century there were two distinct hamlets:

- Woodend (to the southern end) which included a huge country house called Woodend House (last reference to this country house is on an 1886 map and this is now completely demolished). Woodend is in the parish of Sunninghill and Ascot and in 2020, there are a few cottages called Woodend Cottages along the Windsor Road towards Ascot.
- Woodside (to the northern end up to the Mounts Hill roundabout, better known as The Peanut Roundabout due to its shape). Woodside is in the parish of Winkfield, Bracknell Forest.

Nowadays the name Woodend has all but disappeared as a descriptor of any part of the hamlet and Woodside is applied to the whole hamlet. The parish and borough boundaries still run through the middle of the Woodside and right through the centre of the Duke of Edinburgh public house. This boundary also runs along a bridleway called Hodge Lane and the old granite boundary markers are still there to be seen, they reflect the historic boundary between the Royal land (now Windsor and Maidenhead) and the East Hampstead land (now Bracknell Forest). The Thatched Cottage in Woodside Village is said to have once been the residence given to the Headmaster of Cranbourne School.

In 2021 it had a population of 500.
