= Oakley Green =

Village in Berkshire, England

Coordinates: 51.47°N 00.67°W

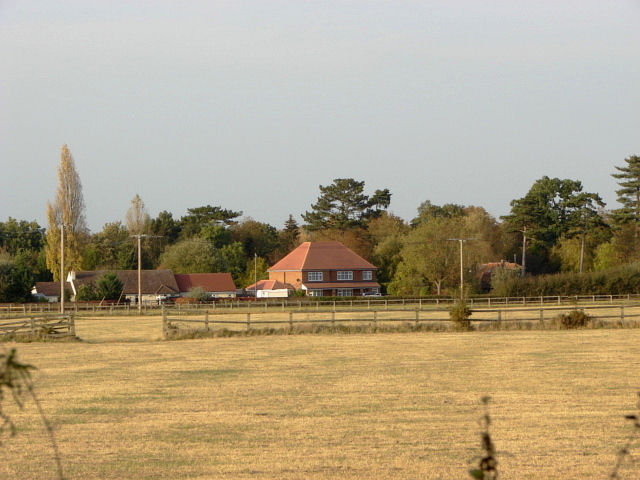
- Oakley Green

- Location within Berkshire
- OS grid reference: SU9276
- Unitary authority: Windsor and Maidenhead
- Ceremonial county: Berkshire
- Region: South East
- Country: England
- Sovereign state: United Kingdom
- Post town: Windsor
- Postcode district: SL4
- Dialling code: 01628
- Police: Thames Valley
- Fire: Royal Berkshire
- Ambulance: South Central
- UK Parliament: Maidenhead

Oakley Green is a village in the eastern part of the civil parish of Bray in the English county of Berkshire. It was used in the film The Devil-Ship Pirates (1964) as the local village.

== Etymology ==
Its toponym is derived from "Oak Clearing," and a green used as common pasture by farmers of the parish.

== History ==
The area is the purported site of the battle of Acleah, in 851, between King Æthelwulf of Wessex and the Danes, resulting in a victory for Æthelwulf. It grew as a small village linking the route between Windsor and Reading, serving as a stop for packhorse traders.
