= Berkshire Lowland Search and Rescue =

Berkshire Lowland Search and Rescue (BLSAR)
- Founded: 1979
- Type: Registered charity
- Registration no.: 1202260
- Purpose: Saving Lives
- Location: Wokingham, Berkshire, UK
- Region served: Berkshire, England
- Volunteers: 70+
- Website: www.berkshirerescue.org.uk

Berkshire Lowland Search and Rescue (BLSAR) is a registered charitable lowland search and rescue team based in Berkshire, United Kingdom. The organisation primary function is to provide search and rescue operations to Thames Valley Police. Secondary functions include water/flood rescue, and aerial reconnaissance to Royal Berkshire Fire and Rescue Service, Thames Valley Local Resilience Forum (LRF) and the emergency planning departments of various local authorities within Berkshire. Like most search and rescue (SAR) teams in the United Kingdom, BLSAR is composed entirely of trained volunteers.

BLSAR was formally called SEBEV, the original meaning of SEBEV was South East Berkshire Emergency Volunteers, however the full title was dropped in 1994 and the team was then known simply as SEBEV Search and Rescue (or sometimes by the media as Berkshire Search and Rescue) in order to better reflect their role. In 2011 SEBEV changed its name again to Berkshire Lowland Search and Rescue (BLSAR).

== History ==
The organisation was originally set up in 1979 by John Cowling as a Civil Defence volunteer team to provide support for local authorities and statutory emergency services during civil emergencies under the Category 1 and 2 responder framework of the Civil Contingencies Act 2004. At its inception the membership predominantly comprised council employees, who met monthly for basic training in message handling, logging and plotting, and map-reading.

In 1981 the organisation acquired its first dedicated headquarter, an ex-street-cleansing depot located on a local housing estate, which was redesigned as a training area with communications facilities. Over time the council staff were replaced by independent volunteers, and the team eventually became composed entirely of non-local-authority members (except for the borough’s Emergency Planning Liaison Officer). In 1984 the team relocated its headquarters to the basement area of Easthampstead Park in Wokingham (a former government bomb shelter), where it remained for many years.

Since 1995, the team’s principal role has been to provide lowland search and rescue capability across Berkshire, operating 24 hours a day to assist Thames Valley Police with missing-person searches in both urban and rural environments. BLSAR also supports other search and rescue teams in neighbouring counties when requested through the Association of Lowland Search and Rescue (ALSAR) network.

In 2018, BLSAR moved from the Easthampstead Park facility, where it has been in a number of temporary premises since.

== Activities and Training ==
BLSAR meets weekly for training in areas such as search techniques, water rescue, drone piloting, navigation, radio communications, first aid (including use of Automatic External Defibrillators), rescue skills, team coordination, and leadership. Additional weekend exercises and multi-agency training sessions are held throughout the year.

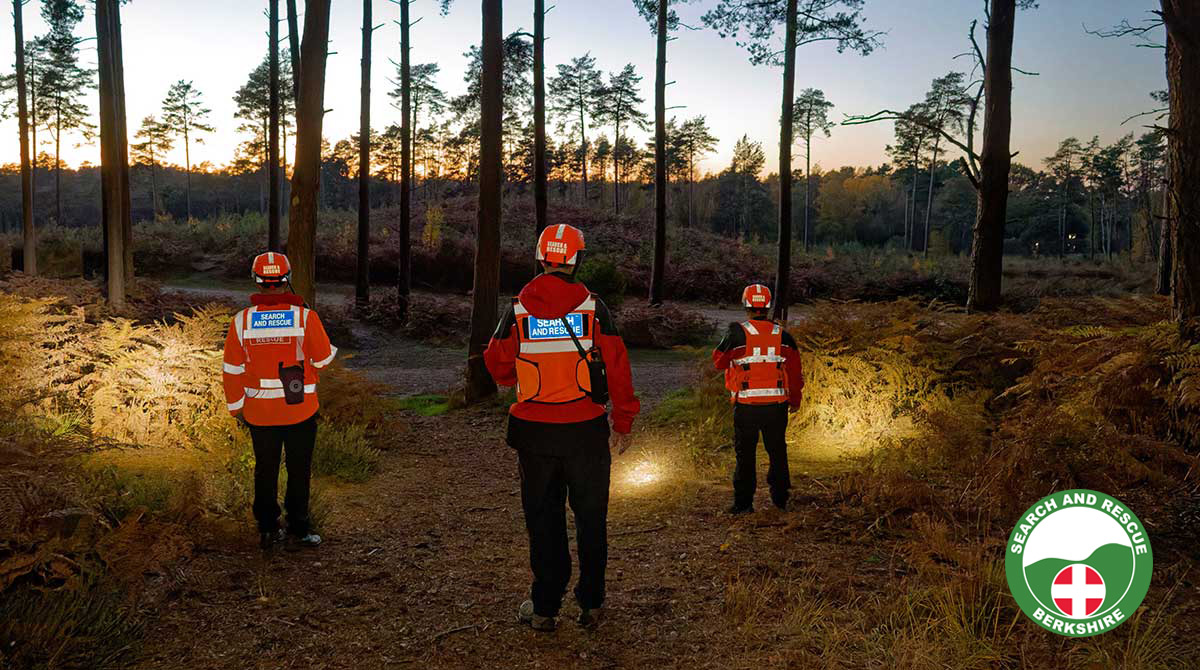
Search team

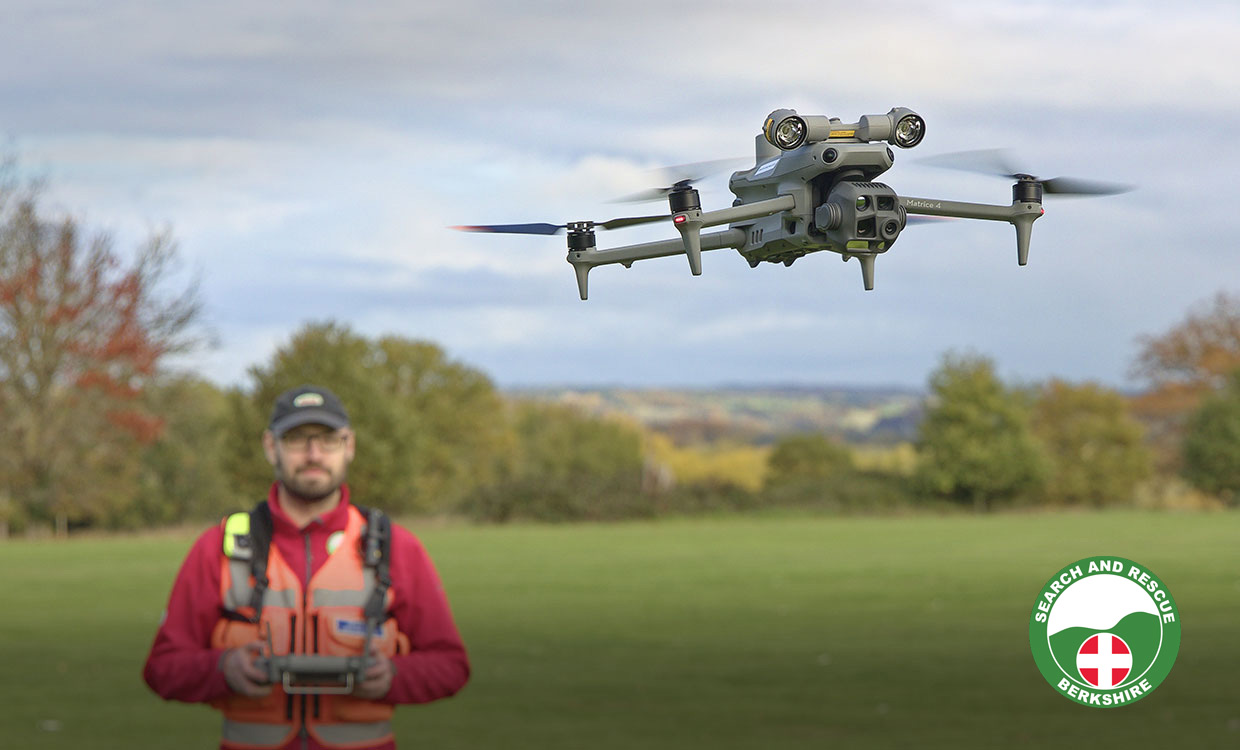
Drone Team

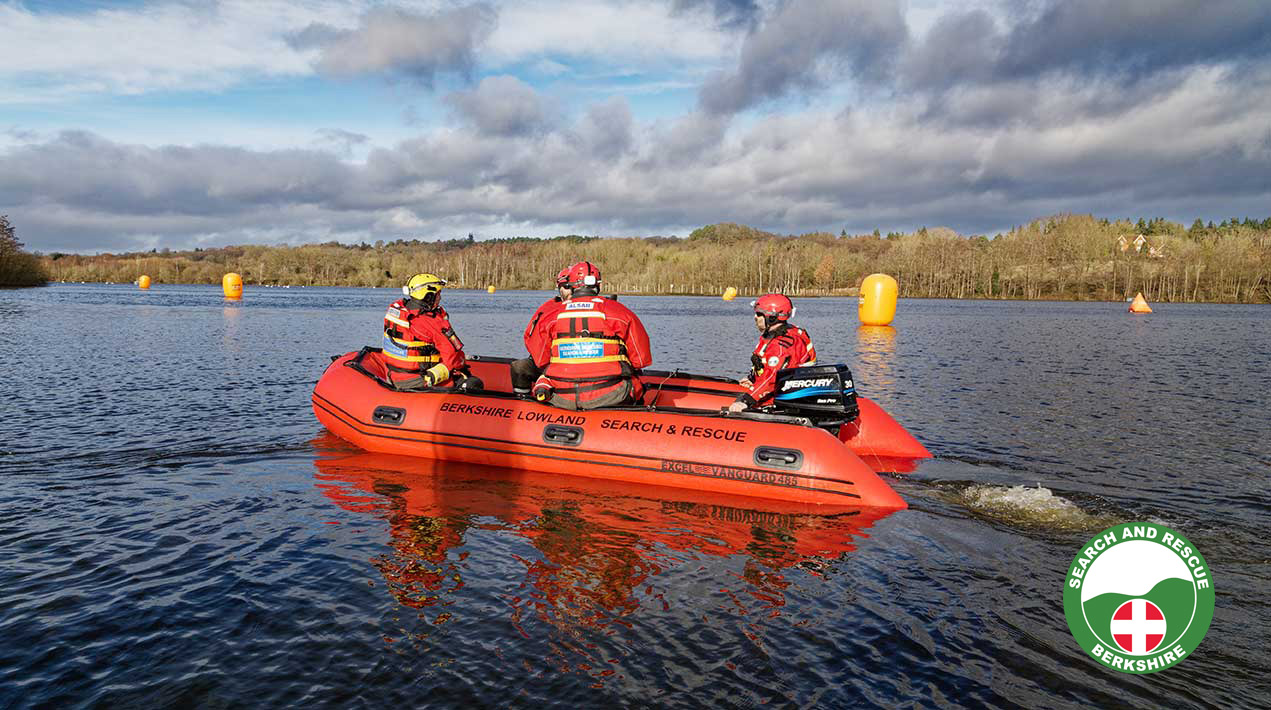
Water Team

The team maintains its own incident control vehicle (ICU), incident support vehicle (ISU), Water Rescue Unit (WRU) and a range of specialist equipment for rescue, medical support, and scene management. Specialist units include water search and rescue teams, equipped with rescue boats, side-scan sonar, and underwater cameras, Drone Teams with high resolution thermal imaging drones.

BLSAR is a registered charitable incorporated organisation (CIO) staffed entirely by trained volunteers. It receives no statutory funding, relying on donations, grants, and fundraising to cover its annual operating costs - typically between £40,000 and £45,000. In 2025, BLSAR recorded 43 operational deployments and over 14,000 volunteer hours supporting Thames Valley Police and Royal Berkshire Fire & Rescue Service. They are increasingly being utilised by RBFRS using their Thermal Imaging Drones to support large fire incidents

In addition to search and rescue operations, BLSAR works closely with local authorities and the Thames Valley Local Resilience Forum (LRF) during severe weather events and civil emergencies. The team assists with evacuations, provides logistical and welfare support at rest centres, and helps maintain transport and communications links when conventional routes are disrupted (e.g., during flooding, snow, or storms).

BLSAR personnel are trained to operate in challenging environments, supporting local councils and emergency planners during major incidents, extreme weather, and public safety operations. Their contribution forms part of Berkshire’s integrated emergency-response capability, complementing the efforts of police, fire, ambulance, and voluntary sector partners.

== Fundraising and Events ==
BLSAR is a wholly volunteer-run charity that receives no statutory funding. The team is sustained entirely through the dedication of its members and the generosity of the public, relying on fundraising events, community initiatives, local sponsorships, and occasional charitable grants or donations to cover its annual operational costs. Every piece of equipment, vehicle, and uniform is funded through these efforts, ensuring that the team remains ready to respond 24 hours a day, 365 days a year.

Beyond emergency response, BLSAR plays an active role in the Berkshire community, regularly providing first aid cover, marshalling, and stewarding for local events such as carnivals, music festivals, charity runs, sporting events, and firework displays. These activities not only help raise essential funds but also strengthen the team’s connection with the public it serves — building awareness of its vital work in search and rescue across the county.
