= Englemere Pond =

Nature reserve in Berkshire, England

- Site of Special Scientific Interest
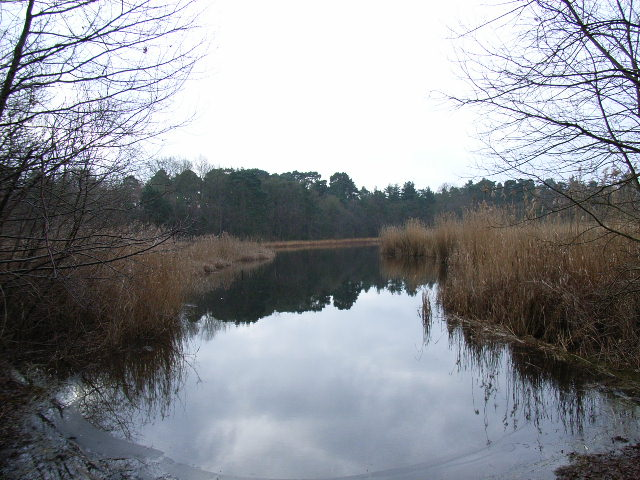

- Location within Berkshire
- Location of Englemere Pond.
- Area of search: Berkshire
- Grid reference: SU 904 685
- Coordinates: 51.409°N 0.701°W
- Interest: Biological
- Area: 26.1 hectares (64 acres)
- Notification date: 1983
- Location map: Magic Map

Englemere Pond is a 26.1-hectare (64-acre) biological Site of Special Scientific Interest on the southern outskirts of North Ascot in Berkshire. The site is also a Local Nature Reserve. It is owned by the Crown Estate and managed by Bracknell Forest Borough Council.

== Geography ==
The nature reserve is situated between Martins Heron railway station and Ascot railway station. It features a shallow acidic lake and marsh land.

== Name ==
Probably compound of Old Saxon egela "leech", or even Old English *egele (unattested), similar to German Egel (Blutegel) "leech", followed by Old Saxon meri "lake" or Old English mere "lake, pool", hence the overall meaning of "leech pool". Moreover, the early forms of Inglemire (East Riding of Yorkshire, Yghelmar 1322; Iglemere / Inglemere 1408) are identical to the common Norman place names Iglemare and Inglemare and are explained as follows: a compound of the Old Norse word igill "leech" and mere "body of water".

== History ==
The land for most of its recorded history has been part of a great Royal Hunting Forest that surrounded Windsor Castle.

In 1990 the site was declared as a local nature reserve by Bracknell Forest Borough Council.

In August 2016 an unexploded old military shell was discovered in Englemere Pond and blown up in a controlled explosion by the police.

== Fauna ==
The fauna of the reserve include the following:

=== Birds ===
- Little grebe
- Water rail
- Great spotted woodpecker
- Coal tit
- Long-tailed tit
- Goldcrest
- Nuthatch
- Treecreeper
- Jay
- Common reed bunting
- Common chiffchaff
- Eurasian blackcap
- Garden warbler
- Sedge warbler
- Eurasian reed warbler
- Spotted flycatcher
- Tawny owl
- Lesser redpoll
- Gadwall
- Northern shoveler
- Eurasian teal
- Sand martin
- Swallow

=== Invertebrates ===
- Hairy dragonfly
- Common hawker
- Golden-ringed dragonfly
- Libellula depressa
- Keeled skimmer
- Beautiful demoiselle
- Banded demoiselle
- Lestes sponsa
- Erythromma najas
- Large red damselfly
- Blue-tailed damselfly
- Enallagma cyathigerum
- Azure damselfly
- Southern Hawker
- Brown hawker
- Migrant Hawker
- Emperor dragonfly
- Downy emerald
- Brilliant emerald
- Black-tailed skimmer
- Four-spotted chaser
- Sympetrum danae
- Ruddy darter
- Common darter

=== Reptiles, amphibians and other vertebrates ===
- Grass snake
- Common toad
- Palmate newt
- Adders

== Flora ==
The flora of the reserve include the following:

=== Trees ===
- Oak
- Scots pine
- Hornbeam
- Rowan
- Silver birch
- Willow
- Cherry
- Alder

=== Other ===
- Drosera rotundifolia
- Calluna
- Erica cinerea
- Erica tetralix
- Reed
