= Burleigh, Berkshire =

Village in Berkshire, England

Coordinates: 51.420°N 0.693°W

Burleigh
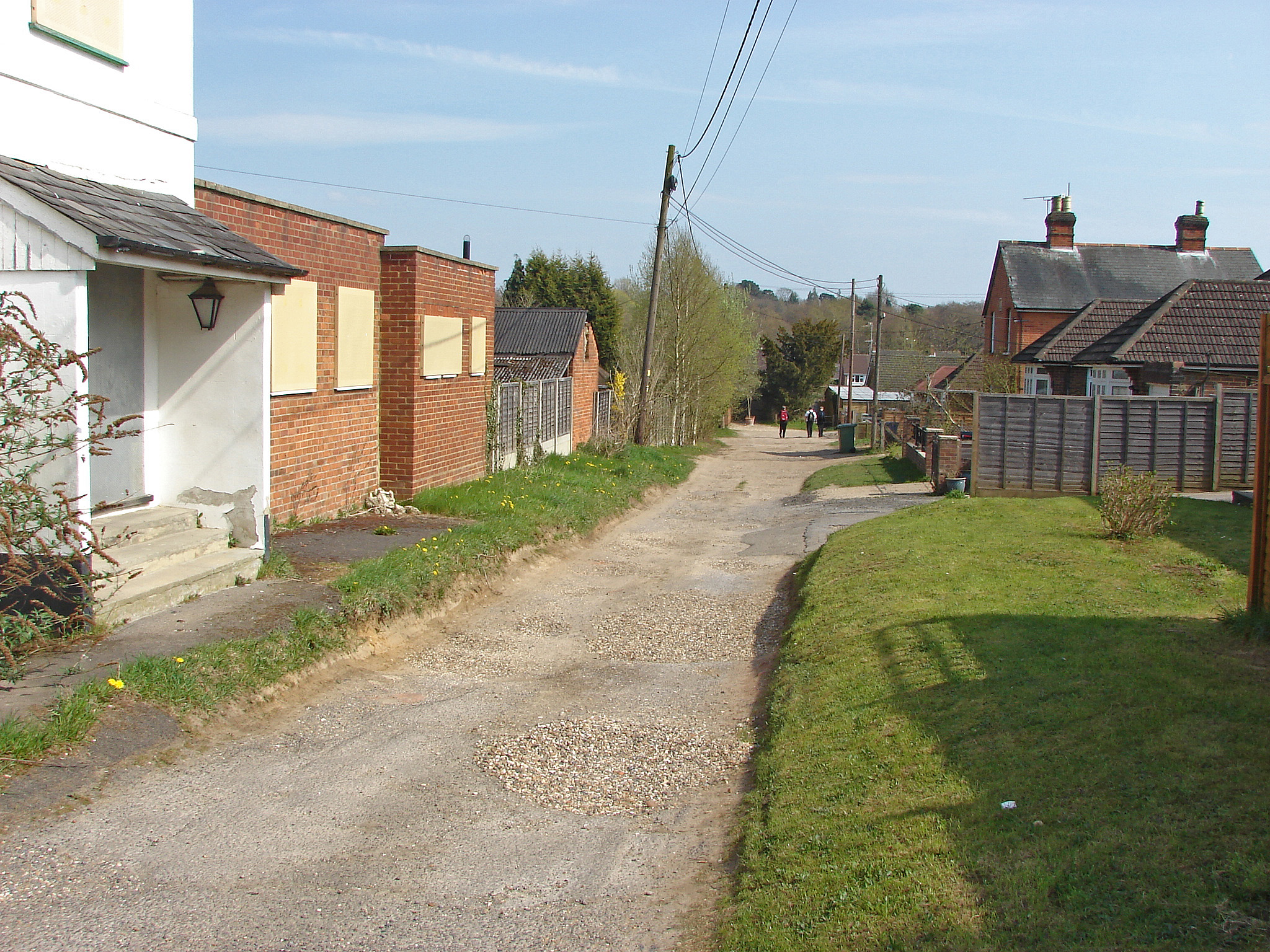
- Gold Cup Lane

- Location within Berkshire
- OS grid reference: SU910699
- Metropolitan borough: Bracknell Forest
- Metropolitan county: Berkshire
- Region: South East
- Country: England
- Sovereign state: United Kingdom
- Post town: ASCOT
- Postcode district: SL5
- Dialling code: 01344
- Police: Thames Valley
- Fire: Royal Berkshire
- Ambulance: South Central
- UK Parliament: Maidenhead

Burleigh is a village in Berkshire, England, within the civil parish of Winkfield. It lies east of the A332 road and about 1 mile (1.6 km) west of Ascot Racecourse.
