= Winkfield =

Village in Berkshire, England

Coordinates: 51.432°N 0.710°W

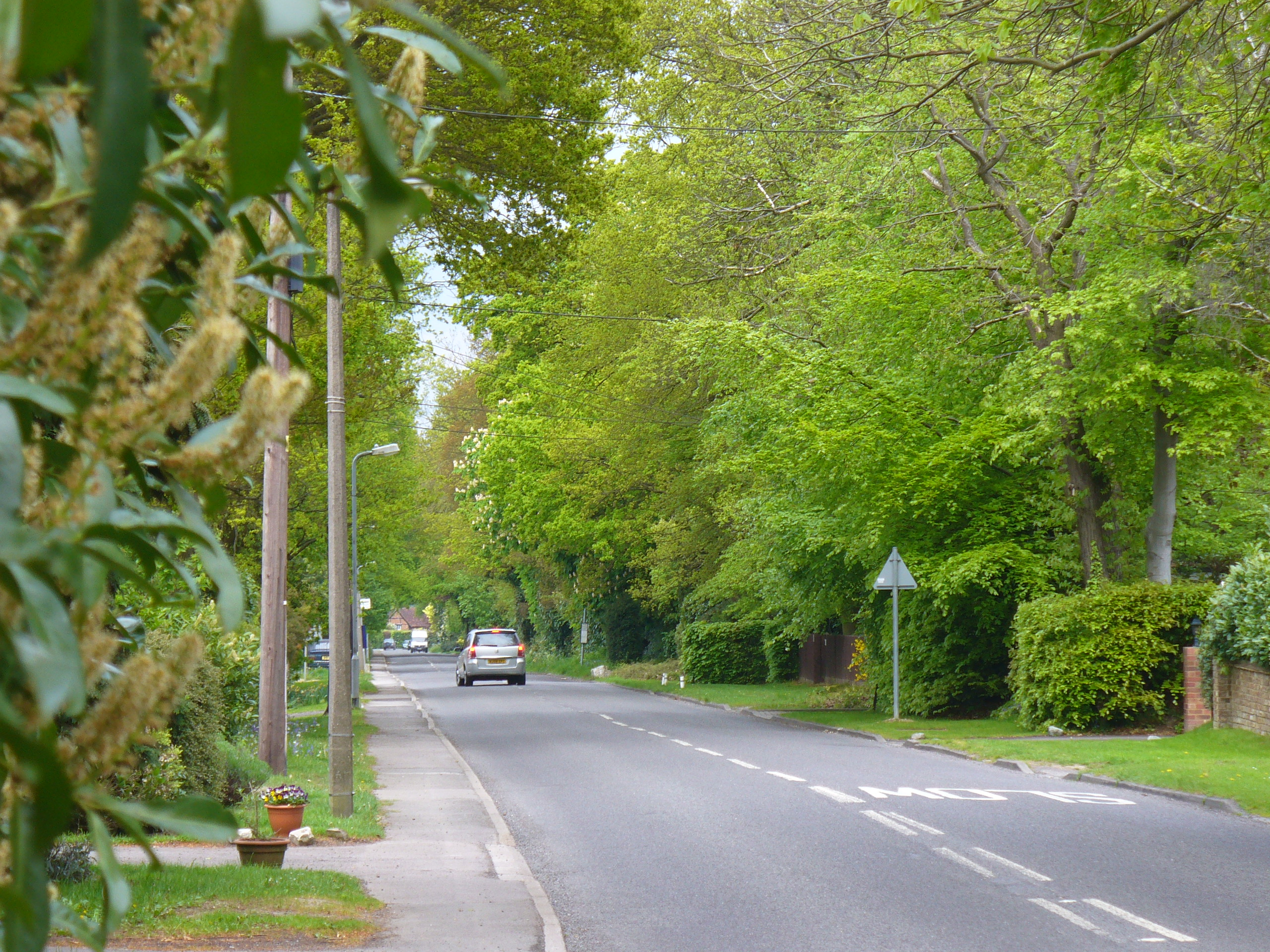
- Locks Ride in Winkfield Row

- Location within Berkshire
- Population: 15,144 (2021 Census)
- OS grid reference: SU898711
- Civil parish: Winkfield
- Unitary authority: Bracknell Forest
- Ceremonial county: Berkshire
- Region: South East
- Country: England
- Sovereign state: United Kingdom
- Post town: WINDSOR
- Postcode district: SL4
- Dialling code: 01344
- Police: Thames Valley
- Fire: Royal Berkshire
- Ambulance: South Central
- UK Parliament: Maidenhead Bracknell (minor)

Winkfield is a village and civil parish in the Bracknell Forest unitary authority of Berkshire, England.

== Geography ==
According to the 2011 census, the parish had a population of 14,998. The parish includes the hamlets of Winkfield, Maidens Green, Winkfield Row, Burleigh, Winkfield Street, Chavey Down, Woodside, Cranbourne and Swinley, part of the village of North Ascot. The parish used to be slightly larger – additionally covering what is now Bullbrook, Crown Wood and Harmans Water – and is said to have been one of the largest in Berkshire.

== History ==
There is evidence of human occupation in Winkfield in prehistoric times. From the Late Iron Age, this evidence becomes more substantial, although there is as yet no hard evidence of settlement until the early Medieval era. Winkfield was recorded in the Domesday Book of 1086 as Wenesfelle, and was recorded to have 20 households and 20 ploughlands, suggesting the area was a rich agricultural settlement. William the Conqueror, in establishing his home at Windsor Castle, also incorporated Winkfield into Windsor Great Park, where it would remain until the 20th century. At the west end of the village stands the Church of England church of St Mary's.

The principal lodge at Winkfield was Foliejon Park. There is some evidence that a great tower once stood in the grounds which would have been visible for many miles around Winkfield. Between March 1942 and the end of World War II in June 1945 Foliejon Park was the residence of Haakon VII of Norway and his son, Crown Prince Olav. A 15th-century former inn, the Prince of Wales on Winkfield Street, is now a private residence. Winkfield's New Lodge was the home of Princess Sophia of Gloucester, a niece of King George III. In the early 1960s, the United Kingdom aided a Canadian satellite mission Alouette 1 by providing the use of a ground station at Winkfield.

== Sport and recreation ==
Winkfield has a King George's Field in memory of King George V. Winkfield also has a semi-professional football team: AFC Winkfield were formed in 2019 and currently play their home games at The Timbers in nearby Virginia Water.

== Education ==
Winkfield Row has a local primary school, Winkfield St Mary's Church of England Primary School, and a co-educational independent preparatory school called Lambrook, for both day and boarding pupils.
