= George Green, Buckinghamshire =

Hamlet in Buckinghamshire, England

Coordinates: 51.521°N 0.559°W

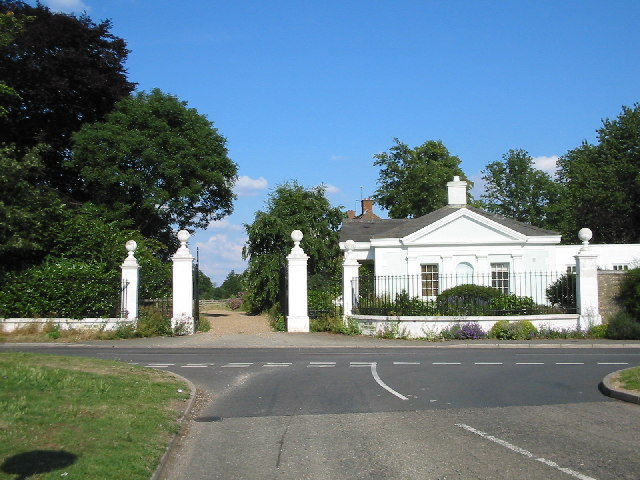
Gateway in George Green, 2005

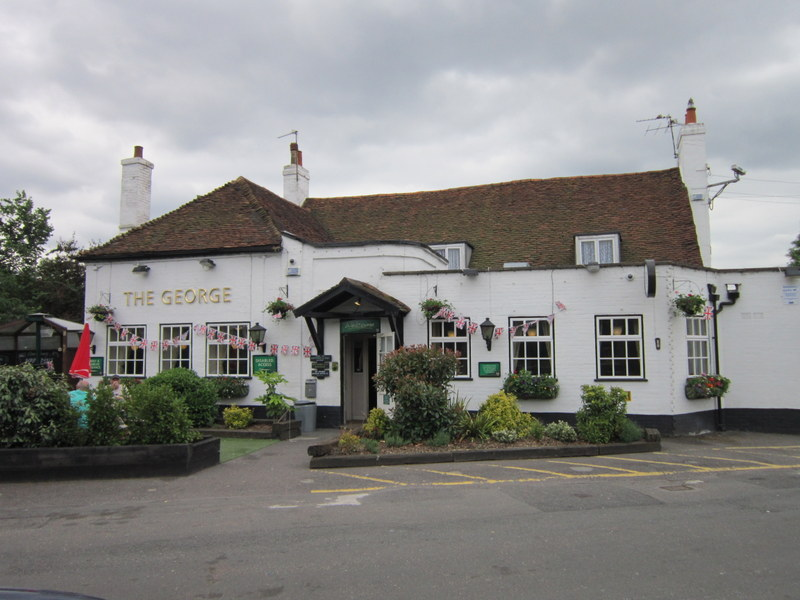
The George, a historic pub which has since closed, pictured 2012

George Green is a hamlet in the parish of Wexham, in the Buckinghamshire district of the ceremonial county of Buckinghamshire, England. It is situated between Slough and Iver Heath, close to the boundary of the borough of Slough. To the south is the hamlet of Middlegreen.

The hamlet is named after King George I. Close by are Langley and Black Park. The George, a historic pub, used to be located here but closed during the COVID-19 pandemic and never opened again.
