= Borough of Slough =

- Borough and unitary authority
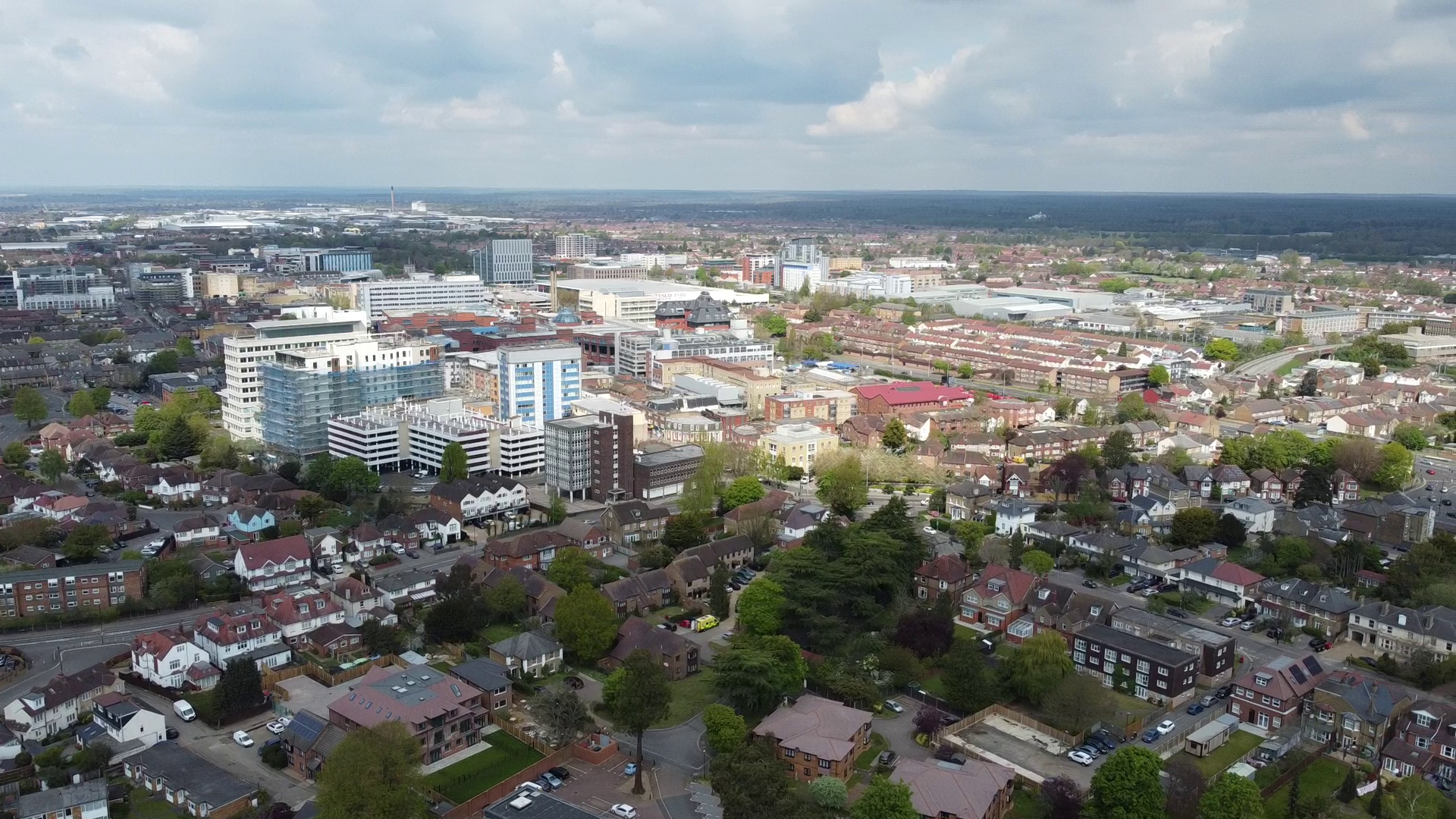
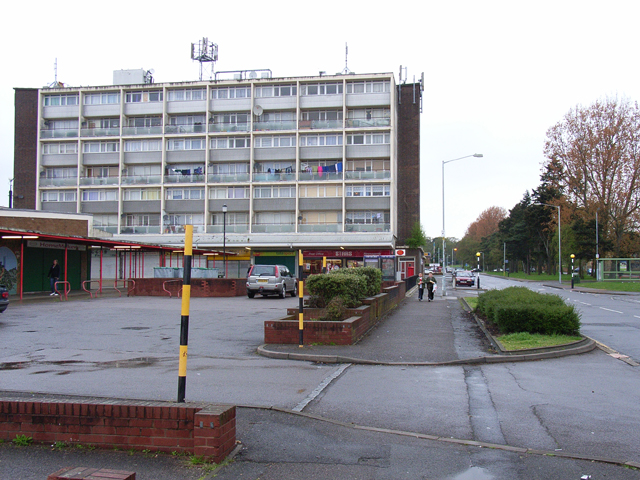
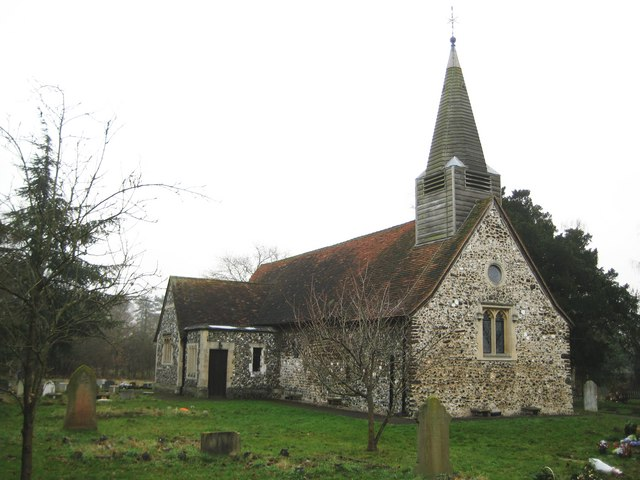
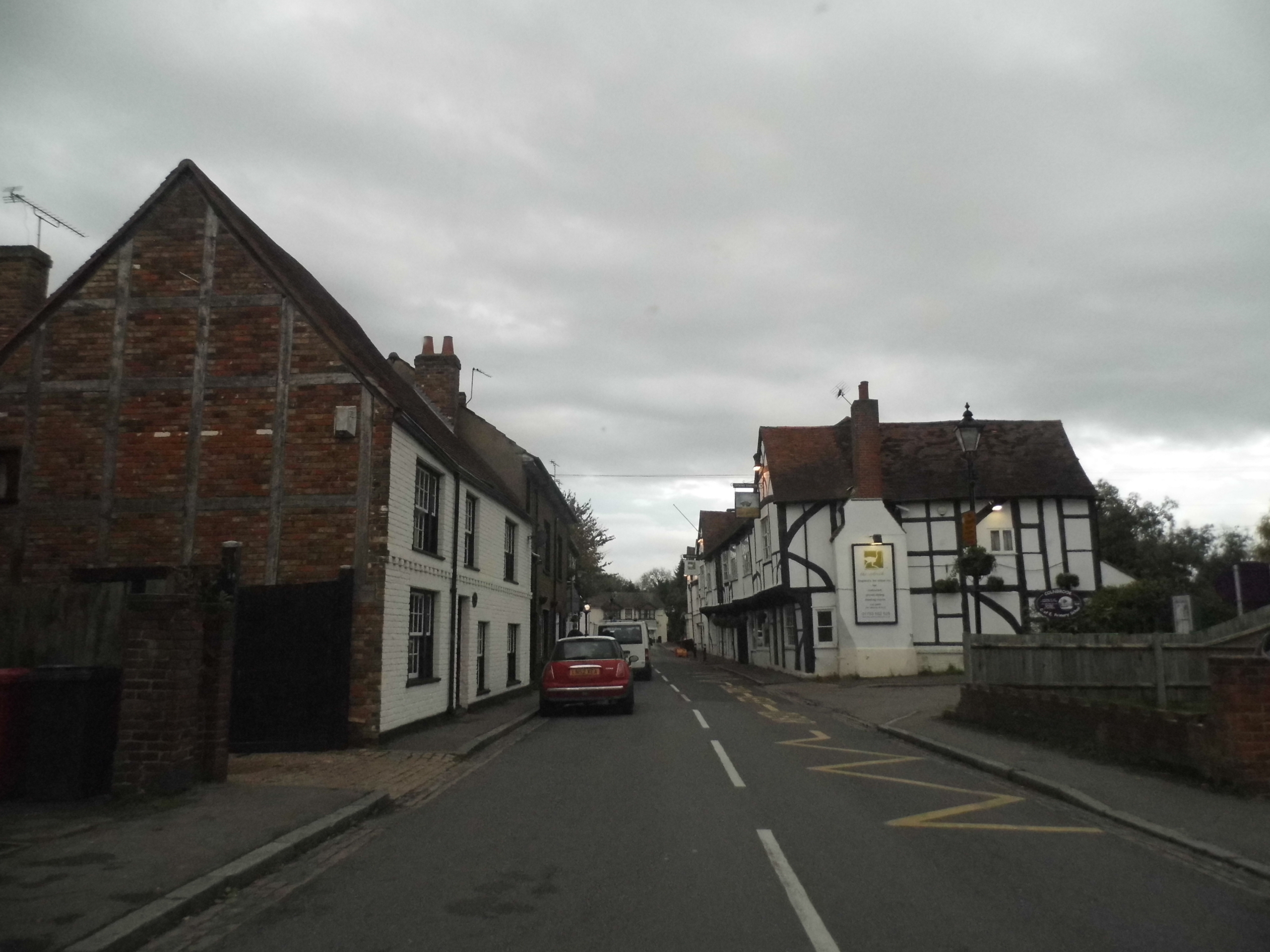
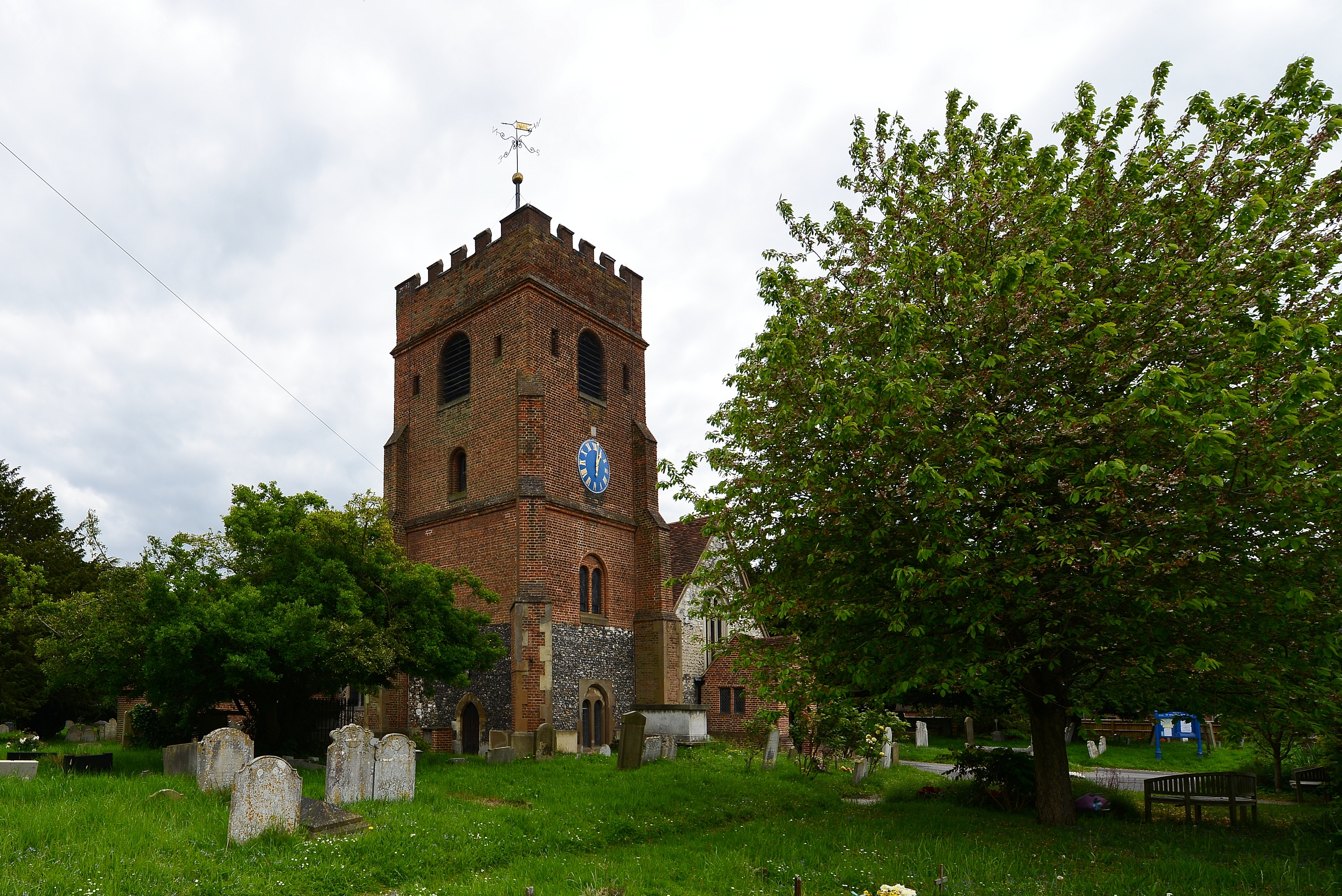
- From left to right; Top: Slough town skyline; Middle: Wentworth Avenue, Britwell and Wexham Court St Mary's Church; Bottom: Colnbrook High Street and Langley St Mary's Church

- Coat of arms

- Slough shown within Berkshire

- Location within England
- Sovereign state: United Kingdom
- Constituent country: England
- Region: South East England
- Commuter Belts: London Commuter Belt
- Ceremonial county: Berkshire
- Constituencies: Slough
- Seat: Slough

Area
  - Total: 21 sq mi (54 km^{2})
  - Rank: 276th

Population (2024)
  - Total: 167,359
  - Rank: Ranked 126th
  - Density: 8,000/sq mi (3,100/km^{2})

Ethnicity (2021)
  - Ethnic groups: List: 46.7% Asian; 36% White; 7.6% Black; 5.7% other; 4% Mixed

Religion (2021)
  - Religion: List: 32% Christianity; 29.4% Islam; 25.5% other; 13.1% no religion
- Time zone: UTC+0 (Greenwich Mean Time)
  - Summer (DST): UTC+1 (British Summer Time)
- Postcode: SL1-3, SL60-95 (Non-geographic)
- Area code: SL
- ISO 3166-2: GB-SLG
- ONS code: 00EH (ONS); E06000039 (GSS)
- Website: www.slough.gov.uk

The Borough of Slough is a unitary authority with borough status in the ceremonial county of Berkshire, Southern England. It is governed by Slough Borough Council. The borough is centred around the town of Slough and includes Langley. It forms an urban area with parts of Buckinghamshire and extends to the villages of Burnham, Farnham Royal, George Green, and Iver. Part of the district's area was in Buckinghamshire prior to the district's formation and in Middlesex until 1965.

== History ==
The borough was formed on 1 April 1974 under the Local Government Act 1972 from the Municipal Borough of Slough and parts of the parishes of Burnham and Wexham of which were formerly in Eton Rural District in Buckinghamshire. On 1 April 1995 the parish of Colnbrook with Poyle was transferred to Slough.

== Geography ==
The borough borders the counties of Buckinghamshire (the unitary authority of the same name), Greater London (Hillingdon) and Surrey (Spelthorne), as well as the Royal Borough of Windsor and Maidenhead (also in Berkshire). Notable settlements nearby including London, Reading and High Wycombe. The nearest airport is Heathrow Airport, which is located roughly 7 miles (11 km) to the south-east. The borough has good links to London and other towns and cities with its main connecting road being the M4 motorway. It is also served by six railway stations: Taplow, Burnham, Slough, Langley, Iver and West Drayton. The district contains the unparished area of Slough and the civil parish of Colnbrook with Poyle. The parishes of Britwell and Wexham Court were scheduled for abolition in April 2019, but after an appeal by the parish councils and a judicial review the order was quashed and the parishes remain unchanged.

== Council and cabinet ==
2021 Slough Borough Council election
Party	This election				Full council			This election		
Party	Candidates	Seats	Net	Seats %	Other	Total	Total %	Votes	Votes %	+/−
Labour	{{{candidates}}}	11	▼1	78.6	23	34	81.0	17,227	57.6	-1.4
Conservative	{{{candidates}}}	2	Steady	14.3	3	5	11.9	9,072	30.3	+1.9
Independent	{{{candidates}}}	1	▲1	7.1	2	3	7.1	1,987	6.6	+0.4
Liberal Democrats	{{{candidates}}}	0	Steady	0.0	0	0	0.0	939	3.1	-0.6
Green	{{{candidates}}}	0	Steady	0.0	0	0	0.0	635	2.1	+0.3
Heritage	{{{candidates}}}	0	Steady	0.0	0	0	0.0	66	0.2	New

== Wards ==
The borough comprises 21 wards:

1. Britwell
2. Baylis and Salt Hill
3. Chalvey
4. Cippenham Green
5. Cippenham Manor
6. Cippenham Village
7. Colnbrook and Poyle
8. Elliman
9. Farnham
10. Haymill
11. Herschel Park
12. Langley Foxborough
13. Langley Marish
14. Langley Meads
15. Langley St Marys
16. Manor Park and Stoke
17. Northborough and Lynch Hill Valley
18. Slough Central
19. Upton
20. Upton Lea
21. Wexham Court

Map of Slough showing its wards.
