= Middlegreen =

Village in Buckinghamshire, England

Coordinates: 51.510°N 0.556°W

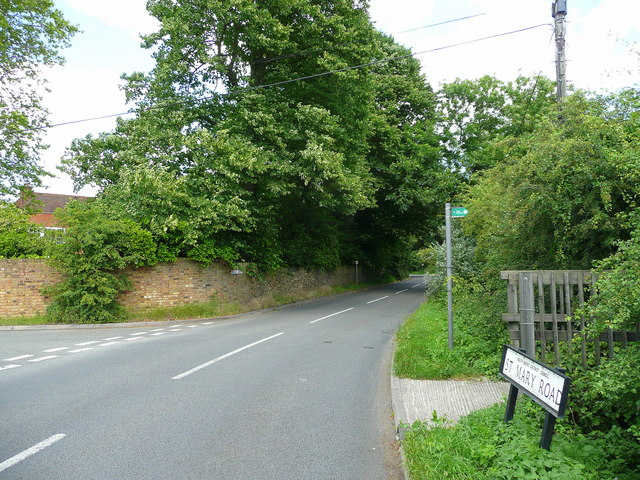
Road junction at Middle Green

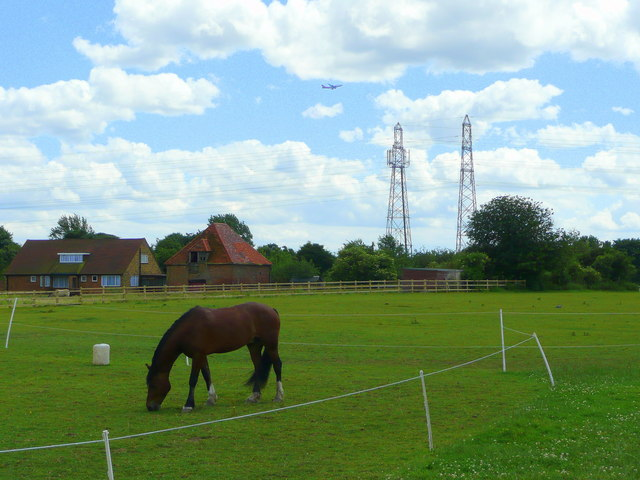
Paddock land in Middlegreen

Middle Green is a village in the civil parish of Wexham in Buckinghamshire, England. It is located within the Metropolitan Green Belt bordering the north-east edge of Slough and close to the Slough Arm of the Grand Union Canal. Just to the south of the hamlet is the Middlegreen Trading Estate, and to the north is the hamlet of George Green.
