= North Ascot =

Area of Bracknell Forest, Berkshire, England

Coordinates: 51.41955°N 0.68527°W

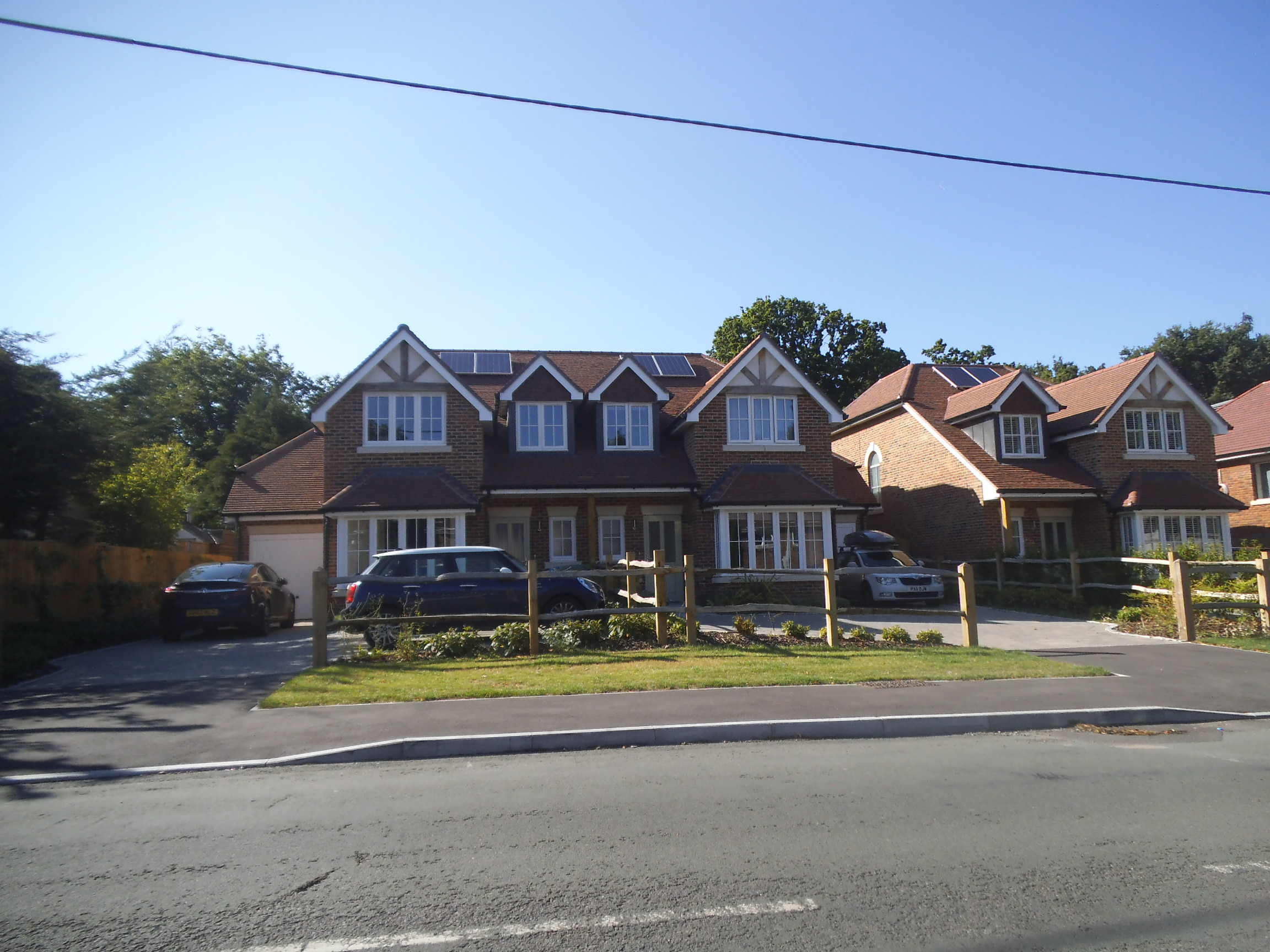
Fernbank Road

North Ascot is an area of Bracknell Forest in the county of Berkshire in England, with a few acres straddling the town of Ascot in the Royal Borough of Windsor and Maidenhead. It lies north of the A329 and west of the A332, adjoining the Ascot Racecourse, Heatherwood Hospital and the village of Burleigh.

== Local government ==
North Ascot is largely in the civil parish of Winkfield in the borough of Bracknell Forest with a small portion in the civil parish of Sunninghill and Ascot in the Royal Borough of Windsor and Maidenhead.

== Housing ==
Houses tend to be large late-Victorian or Edwardian, set in generally spacious grounds. The highest concentration is around the perimeter of the course and towards Windsor Great Park. More modest, recent houses (mostly 1970/80s) can be found on the estate straddled by Gainsborough Drive.

== Nearby places ==
- Towns and cities: Bracknell, Windsor
- Villages: Bagshot, Sunninghill, Sunningdale, Virginia Water

Englemere Pond, a Local nature reserve that is a designated Site of Special Scientific Interest, is situated next to North Ascot. Also located near North Ascot is Camberley and Windlesham.
