= Egypt, Buckinghamshire =

Hamlet in Buckinghamshire, England

Coordinates: 51.563706°N 0.615106°W

Egypt
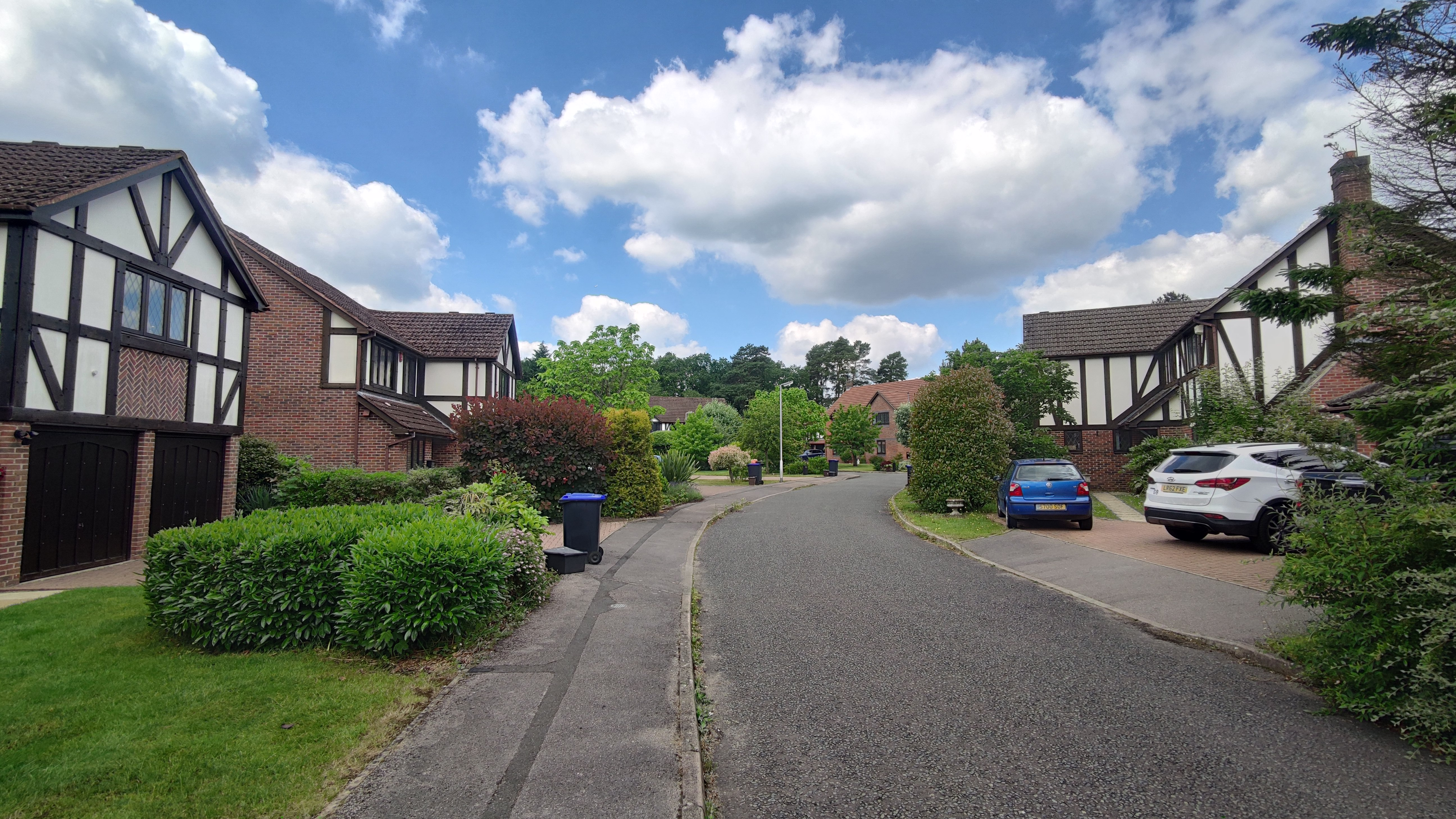
- Housing, Egypt

- Location within Buckinghamshire
- Civil parish: Farnham Royal
- Unitary authority: Buckinghamshire
- Ceremonial county: Buckinghamshire
- Region: South East
- Country: England
- Sovereign state: United Kingdom
- Post town: SLOUGH
- Postcode district: SL2
- Dialling code: 01753
- Police: Thames Valley
- Fire: Buckinghamshire
- Ambulance: South Central

Egypt is a hamlet in the civil parish of Farnham Royal, in Buckinghamshire, England. It is just to the north of Farnham Common, and on the edge of Burnham Beeches. From 1974 to 2020 it was in South Bucks district.

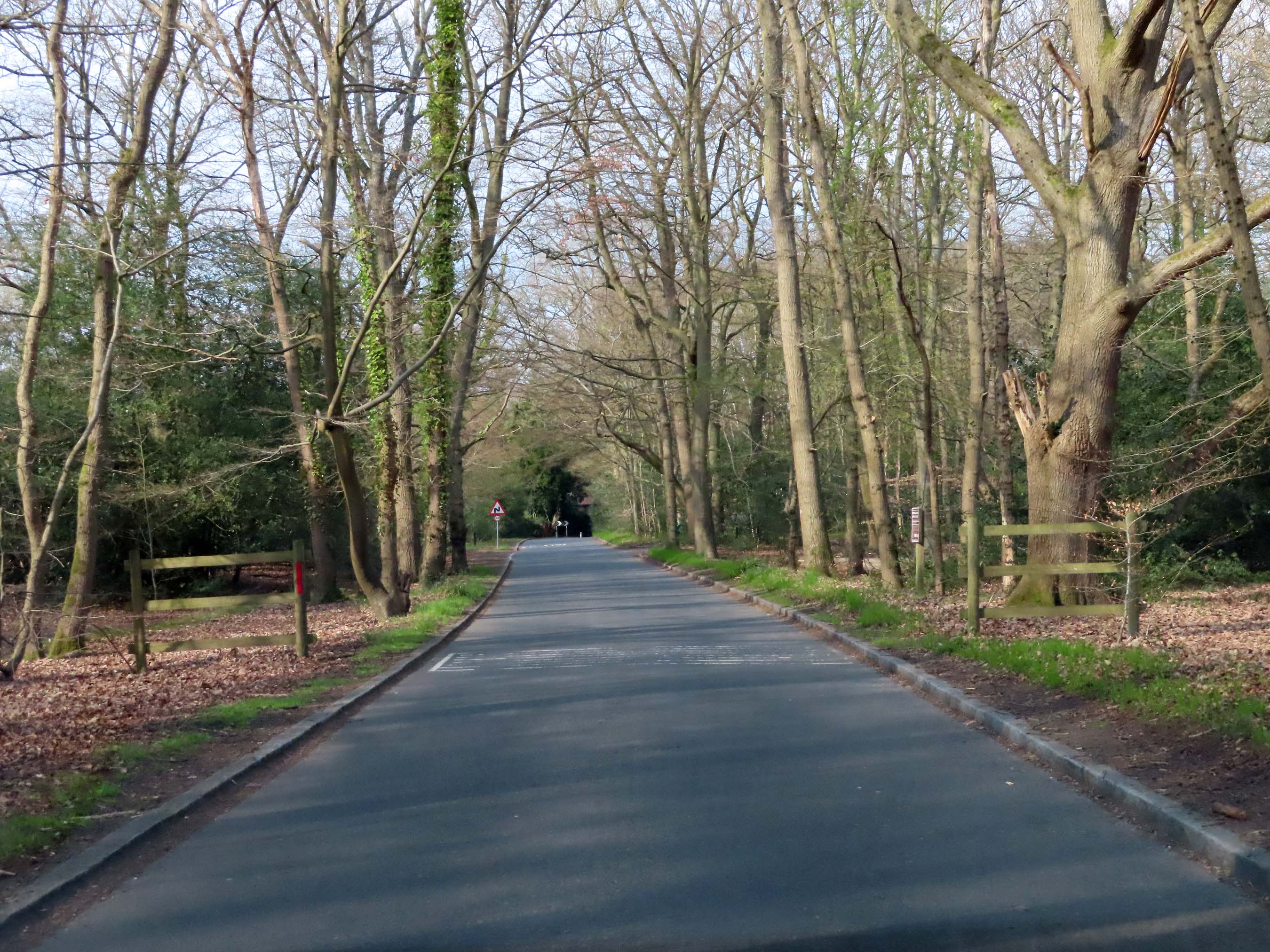
Stewarts Drive, Egypt

It is thought that the hamlet was so named because it was a common settling point for Romani travellers, and the term "gypsy" for such people derives from the Greek Αιγύπτιοι (Aigyptioi), meaning Egyptian.
