= Wexham =

Civil parish in Buckinghamshire, England

Coordinates: 51.542°N 0.566°W

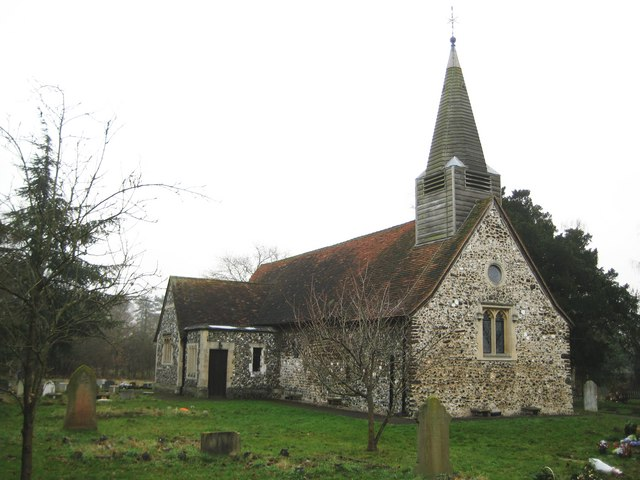
- St Mary's parish church

- Location within Buckinghamshire
- Area: 11.19 km^{2} (4.32 sq mi)
- Population: 2,458 (2021 census)
  - Density: 220/km^{2} (570/sq mi)
- OS grid reference: SU9983
- Unitary authority: Buckinghamshire & Slough
- Ceremonial county: Buckinghamshire
- Region: South East
- Country: England
- Sovereign state: United Kingdom
- Post town: Slough
- Postcode district: SL3
- Dialling code: 01753
- Police: Thames Valley
- Fire: Buckinghamshire
- Ambulance: South Central
- UK Parliament: Beaconsfield
- Website: Parish Council

Wexham is a civil parish in Buckinghamshire in southern England. The largest settlement in the parish is the hamlet of George Green; there are also Wexham Street (half of which is in Stoke Poges parish) and Middlegreen. The parish includes part of the forest of Burnham Beeches, and had a population of 2,458 at the 2021 census.

The separate parish of Wexham Court was created in 1974 from western parts of Wexham parish that were transferred to the Borough of Slough in Berkshire. Wexham Park Hospital is a large hospital within the Wexham Court parish.

== History ==
The parish of Wexham originally covered a relatively small 748 acres (3.0 km^{2}) (1.2 square miles) according to the 1881 and 1891 censuses. It was almost doubled in 1934 by taking in 1,823 acres (7.38 km^{2}) and about 1,000 people from the dissolved Langley Marish parish, a very long strip parish part of which was taken in by Gerrards Cross almost four miles to the north.

Wexham civil parish was split into two parishes in 1974 under the Local Government Act 1972. A new parish called Wexham Court was created from the southern part of the old parish, which was placed in the Borough of Slough and transferred to Berkshire. The reduced Wexham parish remained in Buckinghamshire.

Wexham Court has a parish council with 11 members. It and some additional unparished territory formed the current (adjustable) three-member Slough Borough Council ward of Wexham Lea.

In 2018, the parish of Wexham Court and neighbouring Britwell were scheduled for abolition in April 2019, but after an appeal by the parish councils and a judicial review the order was quashed and the parishes remain unchanged.

The village has a 12th-century parish church and the 16th century Wexham Court. It has protected green spaces comprising woodland, Langley Park and Black Park Country Park.

== Demography ==
2011 Published Statistics: Population, home ownership and extracts from Physical Environment, surveyed in 2005
Output area	Homes owned outright	Owned with a loan	Socially rented	Privately rented	Other	km^{2} roads	km^{2} water	km^{2} domestic gardens	km^{2} domestic buildings	km^{2} non-domestic buildings	Usual residents	km^{2}
Civil parish	453	307	94	73	9	0.247	0.205	0.508	0.084	0.048	2378	11.19

== Education ==
The parish relies for its education on neighbouring villages with greater populations, save that the Japanese international boarding school Teikyo School United Kingdom is in Wexham.

== See also ==
- HMS Wexham, a Ham-class minesweeper
