= Inglemire =

Suburb of Kingston upon Hull, England

Coordinates: 53.776071°N 0.387402°W

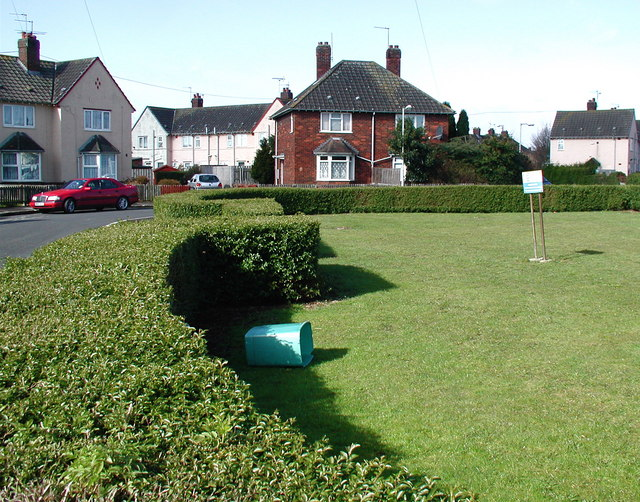
Dingley Close, Inglemire

Inglemire is a suburb of Kingston upon Hull, in the East Riding of Yorkshire, England.

Inglemire has a library, a leisure centre, 2 post offices 6 places of worship and a few schools.
