= SL postcode area =

Postcode area within the United Kingdom

Slough
- Postcode area
- Coordinates: 51.516°N 0.644°W
- Country: United Kingdom
- Postcode area: SL
- Postcode area name: Slough
- Post towns: 8
- Postcode districts: 12
- Postcode sectors: 58
- Postcodes (live): 10,583
- Postcodes (total): 16,620
- Statistics as at May 2020

The SL postcode area, also known as the Slough postcode area, is a group of ten postcode districts in South East England, within eight post towns. These cover east Berkshire (including Slough, Maidenhead, Windsor and Ascot) and south Buckinghamshire (including Iver, Gerrards Cross, Marlow and Bourne End).

Mail for this area is sorted in Greenford (Green Park Way).

== Coverage ==
The approximate coverage of the postcode districts:

Postcode district	Post town	Coverage	Local authority area(s)
SL0	IVER	Iver, Iver Heath, Richings Park, Thorney	Buckinghamshire
SL1	SLOUGH	Slough, Burnham, Cippenham, Farnham Royal, Stoke Poges, Littleworth, Farnham Common	Slough, Buckinghamshire
SL2	SLOUGH	Britwell, Farnham Common, Farnham Royal, Stoke Poges, Egypt, Hedgerley	Slough, Buckinghamshire
SL3	SLOUGH	Langley, Datchet, Colnbrook, Poyle, Horton, Fulmer, George Green, Wexham, part of Richings Park	Slough, Buckinghamshire, Windsor and Maidenhead
SL4	WINDSOR	Water Oakley, Windsor, Old Windsor, Eton, Eton Wick, Clewer, Dedworth, Cranbourne, Winkfield, Dorney, Spital, Oakley Green, Woodside, Boveney, Fifield (east)	Windsor and Maidenhead, Bracknell Forest, Buckinghamshire, Slough
SL5	ASCOT	Ascot, Sunninghill, Sunningdale, North Ascot, South Ascot, Burleigh, Cheapside	Windsor and Maidenhead, Bracknell Forest
SL6	MAIDENHEAD	Maidenhead, Taplow, parts of Cippenham Slough, Bray, Braywick, Cookham, Cookham Dean, Cookham Rise, White Waltham, Hurley, Hurley Bottom, Holyport, Pinkneys Green, Woodlands Park, Furze Platt, Hitcham, Littlewick Green, Burchett's Green, Paley Street, Stud Green, Touchen End, Fifield (west)	Windsor and Maidenhead, Buckinghamshire
SL7	MARLOW	Marlow, Marlow Bottom, Little Marlow, Medmenham, Bisham, Lower Woodend	Buckinghamshire, Windsor and Maidenhead
SL8	BOURNE END	Bourne End, Well End	Buckinghamshire
SL9	GERRARDS CROSS	Gerrards Cross, Chalfont St Peter, Chalfont Common, Horn Hill, Tatling End (west)	Buckinghamshire, Three Rivers
SL60	SLOUGH	Jobcentre Plus	non-geographic
SL95	SLOUGH	Royal Mail	non-geographic

== WM postcode area ==
In 2008, a group of residents in the Royal Borough of Windsor and Maidenhead campaigned to have Windsor and Maidenhead's SL postcodes replaced with WM postcodes, claiming the association with Slough affected the towns' statuses as "desirable places to live". Royal Mail later stated that the campaign would be "unlikely to succeed".

== Map ==
SL postcode area map, showing postcode districts in red and post towns in grey text, with links to nearby GU, HP, KT, RG, TW, UB and WD postcode areas.

== See also ==
- Postcode Address File
- List of postcode areas in the United Kingdom
