= Cocksherd Wood =

Local Nature Reserve in Berkshire, England

Coordinates: 51.536°N 0.639°W

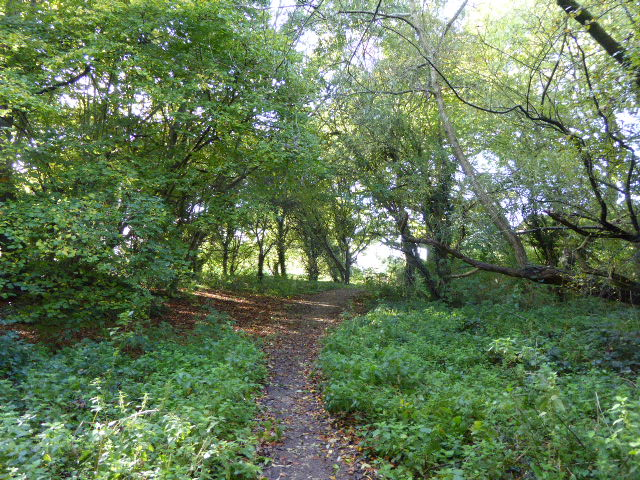
- Interactive map of Cocksherd Wood
- Type: Local Nature Reserve
- Location: Slough, Berkshire
- OS grid: SU 945 828
- Area: 4.8 hectares (12 acres)
- Manager: Evergreen 2000

Cocksherd Wood is a 4.8-hectare (12-acre) Local Nature Reserve in Slough in Berkshire. It is owned by Slough Borough Council and managed by Evergreen 2000. The reserve is known locally as Bluebell Wood.

== Geography and site ==
The site is 11.98 acres (4.85 ha) in size. The site features ancient woodland with coppiced areas and some meadow and grassland areas.

The site lies at the end of a Chalk dry valley, a tributary of the Haymill Valley and is mainly on the Lambeth Group. in 1979 the woods and surrounding land was transferred over to Slough Borough Council.

== History ==
The woods have been there since at least the 1700s as they featured on Jefferys Map of Buckinghamshire which was dated 1766–68. In the 1950s the woodland was bought by the London County Council as part of the Britwell development.

In 1996 the site was declared as a local nature reserve by Slough Borough Council. In 2001 management of the reserve was given to Evergreen 2000 trust.

== Fauna ==
The site has the following fauna:

=== Invertebrates ===
- Small skipper
- Small tortoiseshell
- Meadow brown
- Stag beetle
- Pieris brassicae
- Ringlet

=== Birds ===
- European green woodpecker
- Eurasian bullfinch
- Red kite

== Flora ==
The site has the following flora:

=== Trees ===
- Acer campestre
- Betula pendula
- Corylus avellana
- Crataegus monogyna
- Quercus robur
- Fagus sylvatica
- Fraxinus excelsior
- Ilex aquifolium
- Prunus avium
- Prunus spinosa
- Rhododendron ponticum
- Salix caprea
- Sambucus nigra
- Sorbus aucuparia
- Ulmus procera

=== Plants ===
- Lonicera periclymenum
- Anemone nemorosa
- Carex sylvatica
- Hyacinthoides non-scripta
- Poa nemoralis
- Vicia sepium
