= Maidenhead Advertiser =

Weekly newspaper covering Maidenhead, Berkshire

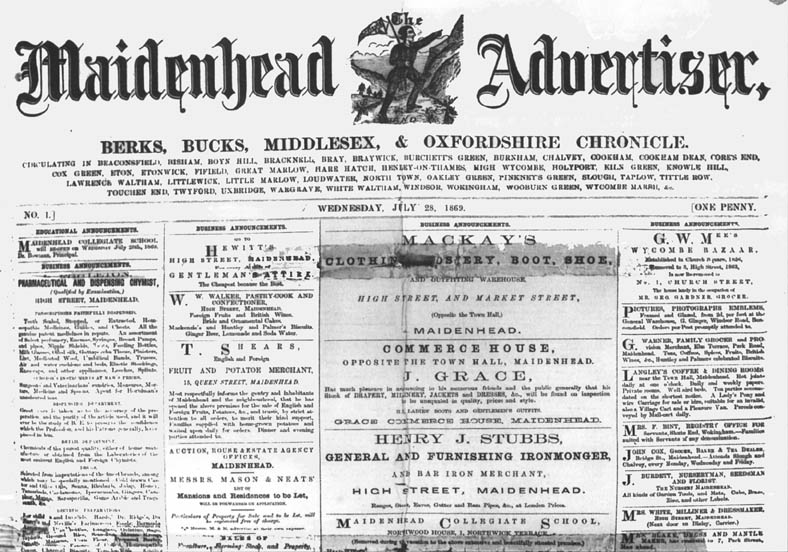
- The first edition of the Maidenhead Advertiser
- Type: Weekly newspaper
- Format: Tabloid
- Owner: Louis Baylis (Maidenhead Advertiser) Charitable Trust
- Publisher: Baylis Community Media CIC
- Editor-in-chief: James Preston
- Founded: 28 July 1869
- Language: English
- Headquarters: Maidenhead, Berkshire, England, UK
- Circulation: 2,446 (as of 2025)
- Website: maidenhead-advertiser.co.uk

The Maidenhead Advertiser is a weekly local paper in England which has been published in the Berkshire town of Maidenhead since 1869.

An independent publication run by the family firm Baylis Media Ltd, it is owned by a charitable trust, the Louis Baylis (Maidenhead Advertiser) Charitable Trust, which contributes donations to the community.

== History ==
=== 1869 to 1901 ===
The first copy of the Maidenhead Advertiser was published on 28 July 1869. Its founder was Edwin Bushell Prosser and his first edition cost one old penny and was four-pages long. Publication day was Wednesday, which was market day in the town. Circulation was about 1,000 and Maidenhead's population was 5,000. However, his venture ran into difficulties and by 1872 he sold the firm to five local businessmen.

Later that year a West Country journalist called Frederick George Baylis joined the partnership and began the family association that continues to this day.

A year later Frederick Baylis bought out the other five men and became the newspaper's editor and sole proprietor. The Advertiser then began to prosper. During these days the Advertiser was based on the corner of Broadway and Grove Road in Maidenhead town centre. Frederick set about modernising the paper and by 1884 the Maidenhead Advertiser and Marlow Chronicle, as it was then called, was firmly established and circulation continued to grow. The first pictures were line drawings and appeared in 1882. The first photographs were published in 1884 and showed floods in the town. In October 1901 the Advertiser left its home in Broadway for Queen Street, where it was to stay for the next 88 years.

=== 1901 to 1989 ===
Frederick Baylis died in 1906, leaving the family business to his four children, Edith, Bertha, Gerald and Watson, who ran the paper as a partnership. From the turn of the century to the outbreak of the Second World War, the Advertiser ticked along, changing little until the appearance on the scene of Louis Baylis, Gerald's son and the man behind the modern Advertiser. Louis saw the Advertiser through the dark days of wartime newsprint rationing, but perhaps the greatest contribution to the paper was to safeguard its future and independence by turning it into a charitable trust in 1962, in effect making a gift of the paper to the town.

Norman Baylis, Louis' brother, who died in 1999, worked alongside Louis in these days and when Louis went into hospital just before the Advertiser's 100th birthday in 1969, Norman took over greater responsibilities. These included the change from broadsheet to tabloid format and the first 100-page paper published in October 1974. Circulation was about 24,000. Circulation and size of the paper continued to grow, with the Eighties seeing papers of more than 180 pages.

=== From 1989 ===
In May 1989 the Advertiser left its home in Queen Street and moved to Newspaper House in Bell Street. Norman Baylis stepped down as chairman in 1989 and his son Gerald, who was in charge of production, took over the role which he held until 2003. The family connection continues, with Norman's eldest grandson Jeremy Spooner holding the position of managing director, and Gerald's eldest son Jason Baylis is the chairman and IT and production director.

Maidenhead Advertiser's website was relaunched in 2007. The company recognised the demand to become a multi-media outfit and began to publish video news content and breaking news as-it-happens. The website won an award in 2008 for the "Weekly Newspaper Website of the Year" from the Newspaper Society. After a few years of rapid growth, the website now actively takes part in social media and achieves almost 30,000 unique visitors each week and these statistic are still rising.

Today the Advertiser employs about 50 people, with the biggest department being editorial. It costs 90p and the circulation/distribution stands at about 16,000.

The offices are still in Bell Street in Maidenhead town centre. In May 2008, the Advertiser bought the Slough and Windsor Express series, which is now also produced in Newspaper House.

== Louis Baylis (Maidenhead Advertiser) Charitable Trust ==
When Louis Baylis set up the trust in 1962 he was determined to preserve the independence of the Advertiser while at the same time to turn it into a benefactor of the town. He wrote his aim was: "To preserve the Advertiser as an independent family concern free from all outside influence and its continuance as part of the civic and social life of the community it serves." It secured it as a truly independent newspaper whose profits fund local good causes.

The Advertiser is wholly owned by the trust, which receives 80 per cent of its profits, instead of money disappearing into the pockets of anonymous shareholders. The Advertiser has passed million of pounds to the trust since it began. It makes grants to charities, good causes and community groups in the town and surrounding areas.

== Supplements ==
As well as the two newspapers published every week with a combined readership of nearly 128,000, Baylis Media Ltd also produces a number of special publications. These are the Business Monthly, Life etc. – a lifestyle glossy magazine – and Weddings etc., both of which are published twice a year.

== Notable Articles ==
On 8 March 2024, Maidenhead MP Theresa May announced that she would not seek re-election as an MP at the general election in the Maidenhead Advertiser before any other publication. With Jack Blanchard, U.K. Editor at Politico, stating "Proper scoop for the Maidenhead advertiser".
