= Royal Berkshire Fire and Rescue Service =

Fire and rescue service in southern England

Operational area
- Country: England
- County: Berkshire

Facilities and equipment
- Stations: 16
- Fire Appliances: 19
- Aerial Ladder Platforms: 1
- Heavy Rescue Units: 1
- Water Rescue Units: 2

Website
- www.rbfrs.co.uk

The Royal Berkshire Fire and Rescue Service (RBFRS) is a statutory fire and rescue service covering the area of the ceremonial county of Berkshire in England. The fire service was formerly administered by Berkshire County Council, but when that was abolished the service became the responsibility of the Royal Berkshire Fire Authority, made up of representatives from the six unitary authorities of Bracknell Forest Borough Council, Reading Borough Council, Royal Borough of Windsor and Maidenhead, Slough Borough Council, West Berkshire Council, and Wokingham Borough Council.

The RBFRS headquarters is located at Newsham Court, Pincents Kiln, in the Reading suburb of Calcot. The service operates from 16 fire stations across Berkshire.

== History ==
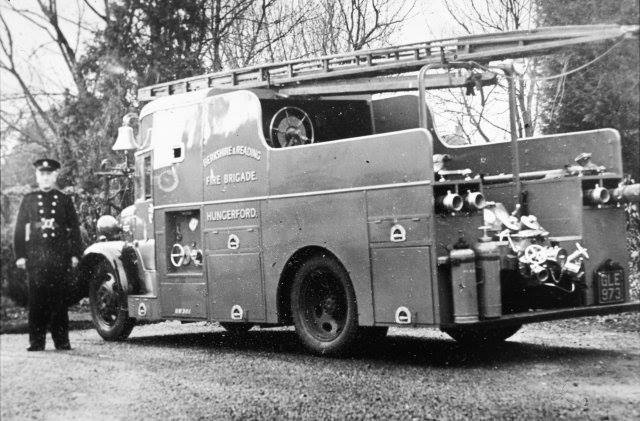
1942 Austin ex National Fire Service B&RFB fire engine from Hungerford

The Berkshire & Reading Fire Brigade was formed in 1948 after the passage of the Fire Services Act 1947, which led control back to brigades in 1948.

The Berkshire & Reading Fire Brigade stayed the same until 1974, when Queen Elizabeth II announced Berkshire was to become a royal county. This was due to the presence of Windsor Castle within the county's boundaries, and as a result, the Berkshire and Reading Fire Brigade changed its name to the Royal Berkshire Fire Brigade. On 1 April 1974, as a result of the Local Government Act 1972 taking effect, the northern parts of Berkshire transferred to neighbouring Oxfordshire, resulting in a reduction of the service's operational area as well as the loss of staff, premises & equipment to the present Oxfordshire Fire & Rescue Service.

Royal Berkshire Fire Brigade operated under the name until 1985, when the name was changed to Royal Berkshire Fire & Rescue Service and a new service crest was introduced.

== Performance ==
Every fire and rescue service in England and Wales is periodically subjected to a statutory inspection by His Majesty's Inspectorate of Constabulary and Fire & Rescue Services (HMICFRS). The inspection investigates how well the service performs, previously in each of three areas. In February 2023, the inspection changed from three areas to 11 individual diagnostic areas, to provide a more precise, transparent view of performance by evaluating specific diagnostic areas rather than blending them into broad, vague categories. On a scale of outstanding, good, requires improvement and inadequate, Royal Berkshire Fire and Rescue Service has been rated as follows:

HMICFRS Inspection Royal Berkshire (Post-2023)
Area	Rating 2024/25
Understanding the risk of fire and other emergencies	Good
Preventing fires and other risks	Good
Protecting the public through fire regulation	Good
Making the FRS affordable now and in the future	Good
Promoting the right values and culture	Good
Getting the right people with the right skills	Good
Ensuring fairness and promoting diversity	Good
Responding to major and multi-agency incidents	Adequate
Making best use of resources	Adequate
Managing performance and developing leaders	Adequate

HMICFRS Inspection Royal Berkshire (Pre-2023)
Area	Rating 2018/19	Rating 2021/22	Description
Effectiveness	Good	Good	How effective is the fire and rescue service at keeping people safe and secure from fire and other risks?
Efficiency	Good	Good	How efficient is the fire and rescue service at keeping people safe and secure from fire and other risks?
People	Good	Good	How well does the fire and rescue service look after its people?

== Fire stations and appliances ==
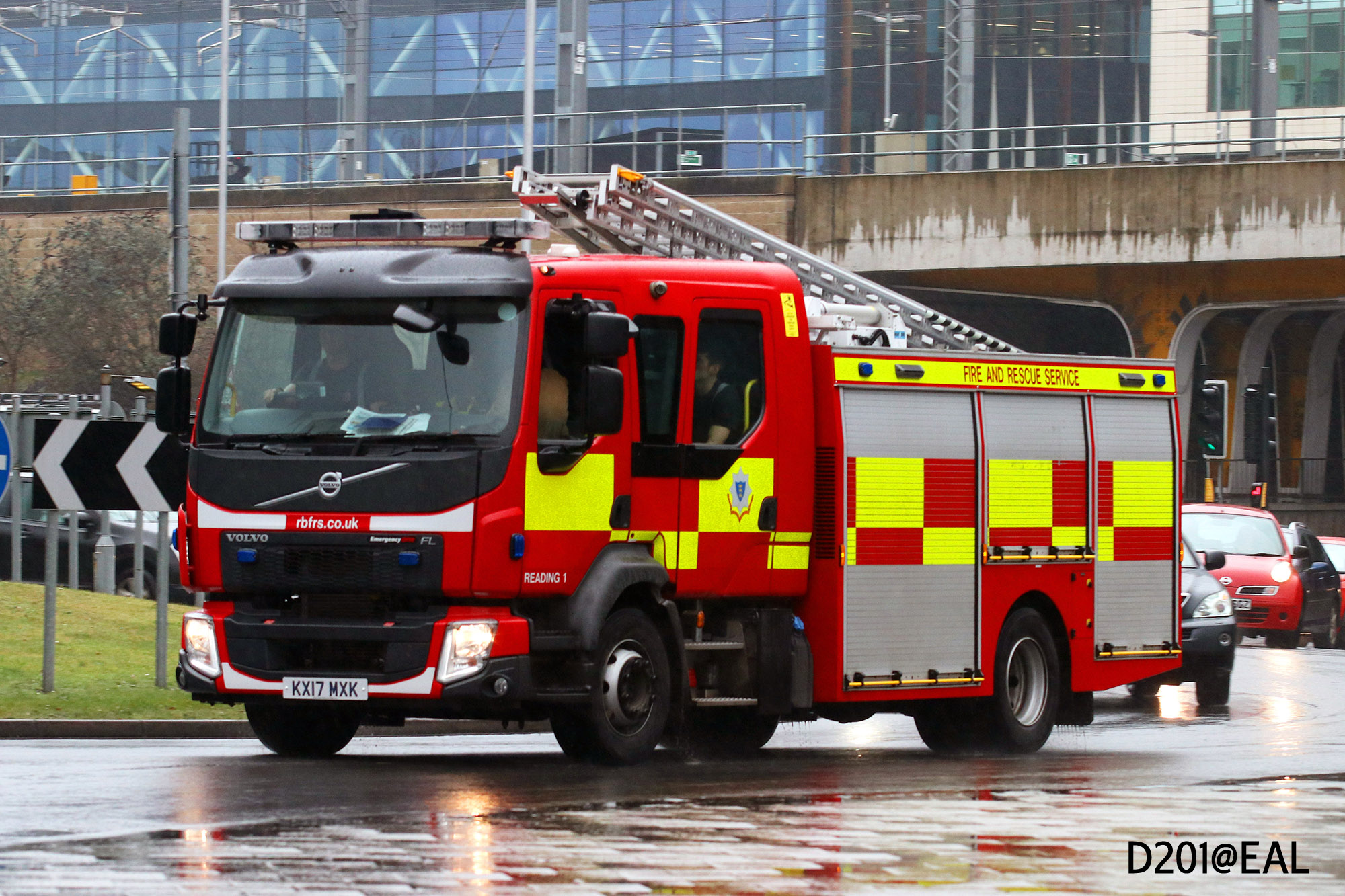
Volvo FL pump rescue appliance in Reading in February 2018

The service operates 16 fire stations – 12 of which are crewed by wholetime firefighters and four use retained firefighters.

The community fire station at Theale, which opened in 2021, is also a base for South Central Ambulance Service and Thames Valley Police. It replaced the former Dee Road (Reading) and Pangbourne fire stations.

Wokingham Road fire station in Reading is also home to the Red Cross Fire Emergency Support Service, who have their own specialist vehicle at the station. The Red Cross team are mobilised by RBFRS control staff to respond to people affected by incidents such as fire or flood. Established in Berkshire in 1993, they can provide food, clothing, and arrange emergency accommodation.

The Headquarters of the service is at a dedicated facility that is not a fire station. This is Thames Valley Fire Control is based.

== Notable incidents ==
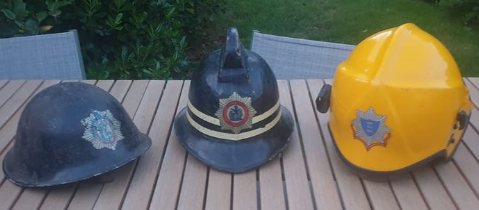
Left a B&RFB Dispatch Riders helmet, Middle a RBFB Sub Officer 'Middlesex' Produced by Cromwell and Right is a RBFRS Pacific F7.

- 1992 Windsor Castle fire – 20–21 November 1992: A work light set a curtain alight inside Windsor Castle, and after workers on site had tried to put the fire out, RBFRS was alerted by Windsor Castle of the fire inside the building, with the first appliances arriving on scene at 11:44 am. During the duration of the fire, around 36–39 pumping appliances and seven specialist appliances attended the scene, with 225 firefighters and 35 officers tackling the fire and also aided the military to help bring out books, carpets and artefacts to safety. After nine hours, the fire was declared under control at 8:00 pm, and was fully extinguished at 2:30 am after over 15 hours.
- Swinley Forest wildfires – 2–8 May 2011: RBFRS were assisted by 12 neighbouring fire services, including the London Fire Brigade, the Hampshire Fire and Rescue Service, the Oxfordshire Fire and Rescue Service and the West Midlands Fire Service, when Swinley Forest set alight as a result of a combination of dry weather conditions and arson. This was later found to have damaged 300 hectares (740 acres) of land. Fire crews returned to the scene for three weeks ensuring all hot spots had been cooled.
- Queen Street Fire, Maidenhead 12 March 2019 - A large fire broke out at approximately 1:58 am in a derelict building on Queen Street, Maidenhead, resulting in most of the town centre being cordoned off and surrounding roads closed. RBFRS deployed around 50 firefighters, 12 fire engines and two high-reach vehicles to tackle the blaze, with firefighters using raised platforms to access the building. Smoke was fanned by strong winds, while access to Nicholsons car park was prevented and local bus services were disrupted. No casualties were reported and the cause of the fire was initially unknown. Firefighting operations were supported by London Fire Brigade, Hampshire Fire and Rescue Service and Buckinghamshire Fire and Rescue Service
- Rowe Court Arson, Reading – 15 December 2021: A significant fire broke out at approximately 2:51 am in a four-storey block of flats at Rowe Court, Grovelands Road, Reading, affecting all levels of the building. RBFRS responded within eight minutes of receiving the 999 call, deploying around 50 firefighters from stations across Berkshire and Oxfordshire, supported by seven officers, an Aerial Ladder Platform, Incident Command Unit and specialist Urban Search and Rescue resources from Buckinghamshire Fire and Rescue Service. Firefighters rescued one resident using a ladder and fire control operators provided survival guidance that enabled another resident to escape. One person was initially confirmed dead and several others remained unaccounted for, while the building suffered extensive structural damage and was subsequently deemed unsafe. A joint investigation by Thames Valley Police and fire investigation teams established that the fire had been deliberately started by former resident Hakeem Kigundu, who had poured petrol in communal areas before igniting it. Kigundu pleaded guilty in September 2022 to two counts of murder, two counts of grievous bodily harm and arson with intent to endanger life. The fire killed residents Richard Burgess, 46, and Neil Morris, 45, and seriously injured two others. The court found the attack to have been a premeditated revenge attack, and on 7 October 2022 Kigundu was sentenced at Reading Crown Court to a whole-life order.
- Station Hill Fire, Reading – 23 November 2023: A significant fire broke out at approximately 11:38am in a high-rise building under construction on Station Hill in central Reading. Royal Berkshire Fire and Rescue Service responded rapidly, with more than 50 firefighters and six officers attending from stations across Berkshire, supported by an Aerial Ladder Platform and Incident Command Unit. Firefighters wearing breathing apparatus used two main jets to tackle the fire, which had developed into a substantial incident. Two people were rescued from the building by a crane operator in an exceptionally skilful operation, assisted by two colleagues who guided the rescue, and were subsequently treated by South Central Ambulance Service before returning home safely. All other people were accounted for. The fire was extinguished after approximately four hours and six minutes, with crews remaining initially to dampen down and later returning to re-inspect the site. The incident involved close cooperation between Royal Berkshire Fire and Rescue Service, Thames Valley Police, South Central Ambulance Service and Reading Borough Council. Following the incident, the site was handed back to the Responsible Person, cordons were removed and the Health and Safety Executive became involved in investigating the cause of the fire.
- Daler-Rowney Fire, Bracknell – 25 May-4 June 2026: A large industrial fire broke out at approximately 3pm at the Daler-Rowney site on Peacock Lane, Bracknell, resulting in a significant emergency service response. At the height of the incident, 15 fire engines and specialist appliances, including equipment used to tackle the fire from height, attended the scene. Approximately 500 people were evacuated from the surrounding area overnight as a precaution due to the scale of the fire and potential health risks associated with the smoke plume. Crews worked throughout the night in challenging conditions to bring the fire under control and extinguish remaining hotspots. Berkshire Lowland Search and Rescue also attended the incident, providing specialist thermal imaging support using drones to assist emergency services in monitoring the fire and identifying hotspots. No casualties were reported and, once the fire was under control, evacuated residents were able to return home as the smoke plume was no longer considered a risk. Firefighting operations concluded on 27 May, although crews remained at the site for a further 24 hours to monitor for hotspots, damp down and ensure the area was safe before the investigation phase began. Royal Berkshire Fire and Rescue Service continued to attend the site alongside partner agencies, with multi-agency meetings led by Bracknell Forest Council supporting the local community's recovery. The incident was formally closed on 4 June, when crews completed their final hotspot inspections and left the site.

== See also ==
- Fire service in the United Kingdom
- List of British firefighters killed in the line of duty
- Oxfordshire Fire and Rescue Service
- Buckinghamshire Fire and Rescue Service
- South Central Ambulance Service
- Thames Valley Air Ambulance
- Thames Valley Police
- Berkshire Lowland Search and Rescue
- British Red Cross
