= Watling Street =

Historic route in England

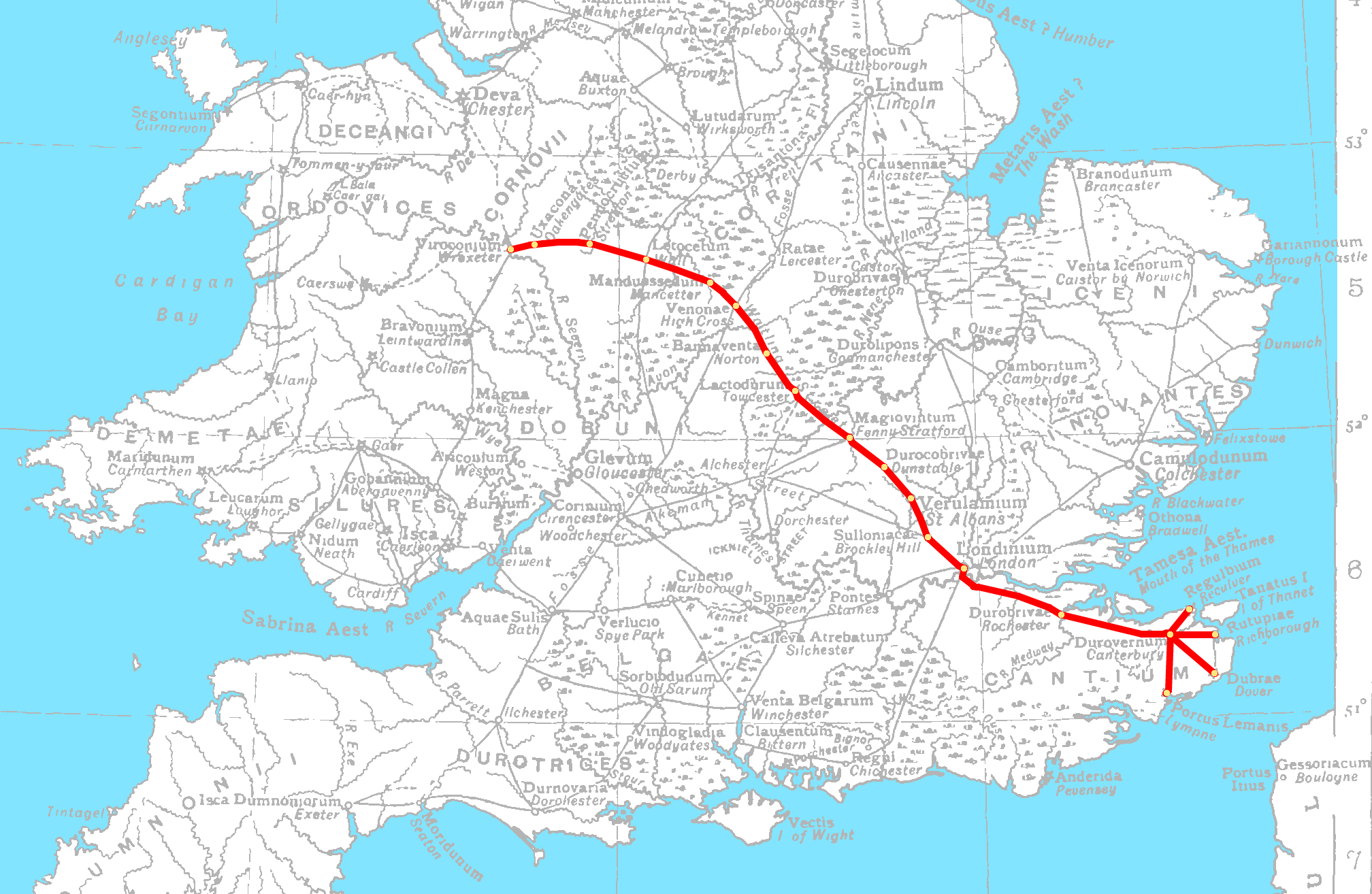
- A map of the Saxon Watling Street overlaid on the Roman road network

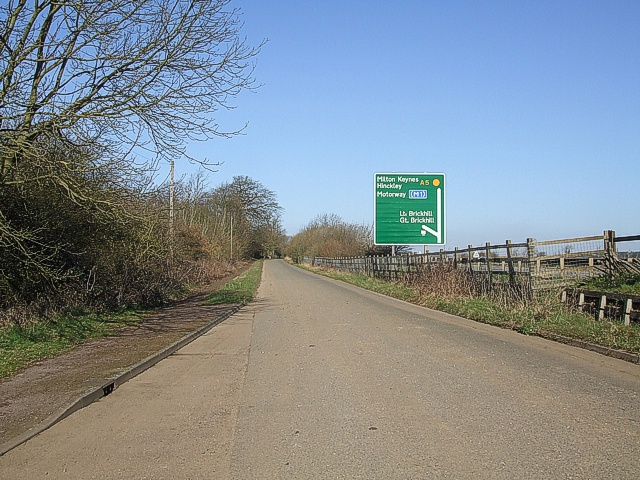
- A stretch of modern-day Watling Street in Buckinghamshire (Note: The sign visible is actually on the A5 bypassing Watling Street on a new alignment just to right of the picture.)

Route information
- Length: 276 mi (444 km) [230 mi (370 km)] Rutupiae to Viroconium
- Time period: Roman Britain; Saxon Britain
- Margary number: 1

Major junctions
- From: The Kentish ports
- Canterbury, London, St Albans
- To: Wroxeter

Location
- Country: United Kingdom

Road network
- Roman roads in Britannia

Watling Street is a historic route in England, running from Dover through London and St Albans to Wroxeter. The road crosses the River Thames at London and was used in Classical Antiquity, Late Antiquity, and throughout the Middle Ages. It was used by the ancient Britons and paved as one of the main Roman roads in Britannia (Roman-governed Great Britain during the Roman Empire). The line of the road was later the southwestern border of the Danelaw with Wessex and Mercia, and Watling Street was numbered as one of the major highways of medieval England.

First used by the ancient Britons, mainly between the areas of modern Canterbury and St Albans using a natural ford near Westminster, the road was later paved by the Romans. It connected the ports of Dubris (Dover), Rutupiae (Richborough Castle), Lemanis (Lympne), and Regulbium (Reculver) in Kent to the Roman bridge over the Thames at Londinium (London). The route continued northwest through Verulamium (St Albans) on its way to Viroconium Cornoviorum (Wroxeter). Watling Street is traditionally cited as having been the location of the Romans' defeat of Boudica, though precisely where on the route is disputed.

The Roman Antonine Itinerary lists sites along the route of Watling Street as part of a longer route of 500 Roman miles connecting Richborough with Hadrian's Wall via Wroxeter. The continuation on to Blatobulgium (Birrens, Dumfriesshire) beyond Hadrian's Wall in modern Scotland may have been part of the same route, leading some scholars to call this Watling Street as well, although others restrict it to the southern leg.

In the early 18th century, England's first turnpike trust was established to pave the route through Bedfordshire and Buckinghamshire. In the early 19th century, the course between London and the Channel was paved and became known as the Great Dover Road.

The route from London to Wroxeter forms much of the A5 road. The route from Dover to London forms part of the A2 road. At various points along the historic route, the name Watling Street remains in modern use.

== Name ==
The original Celtic and Roman name for the road is unknown, and the Romans may not have viewed it as a single path at all, since parts of it were assigned to two separate itineraries in one 2nd-century list. The modern name instead derives from the Old English Wæcelinga Stræt, from a time when "street" (Latin: via strata) referred to any paved road and had no particular association with urban thoroughfares. The Waeclingas ("people of Waecla") were a tribe in the St Albans area in the early medieval period. The Anglo-Saxon name of St Albans was Wætlingaceaster referred to in a charter of 1005; this would translate into modern English as "Watlingchester".

The original Anglo-Saxon name for the section of the route between Canterbury and London was Casingc Stræt or Key Street, a name still borne by a hamlet on the road near Sittingbourne. This section only later became considered part of Watling Street.

== Used as a boundary ==
Watling Street has been used as a boundary of many historic administrative units, and some of these are still in existence today, either through continuity or by its adoption as such by successor areas. For example:

- Watling Street was used as a boundary in the Treaty of Alfred and Guthrum, and it is often inferred that this made the road the southwestern boundary of the Danelaw.
- It is the boundary of Leicestershire and Warwickshire; this may be a legacy of the treaty described above.
- Watling Street forms part of the boundaries of four London Boroughs (Harrow, Brent, Camden and Barnet) and is sometimes described as the boundary of West and North London.

== History ==
=== British ===
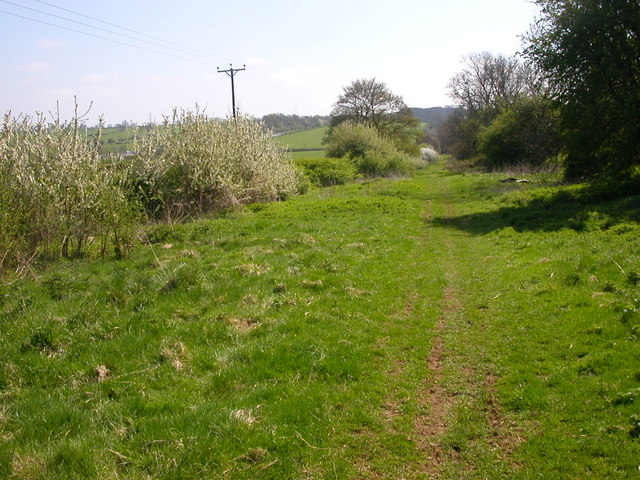
Watling Street near Crick in Northamptonshire

The broad, grassy trackway found by the Romans had already been used by the Britons for centuries. The main path led from Richborough on the English Channel to a natural ford in the Thames at Thorney Island, Westminster, to a site near Wroxeter, where it split. The western continuation went on to Holyhead while the northern ran to Chester and on to the Picts in Scotland.

=== Westminster ford ===
There is a longstanding tradition that a natural ford once crossed the Thames between Thorney Island (present-day Westminster) and the Lambeth/Wandsworth boundary. Its location means that it is possible that Watling Street crossed it.

Several factors may have slowed the river here, leading to the depositing of enough sediments to create a usable ford:

- The bend in the Thames near Vauxhall Bridge.
- The two arms of the River Effra joining in that vicinity, depositing their own load, with the cross-flow causing the Thames to eddy and slow.
- Similarly the southern arm of the Tyburn, once joined the Thames at this point, on the northern bank.
- These factors mean the area is likely to have been the tidal head for some of the historic period.

=== Roman ===
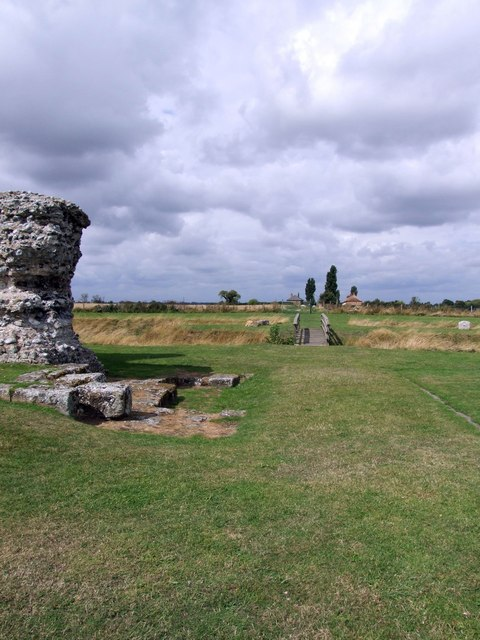
The eastern end of the road at Richborough Castle, one of the Romans' Kentish ports and a Saxon Shore fort (visible at left)

The Romans began constructing paved roads shortly after their invasion in AD 43. The London portion of Watling Street was rediscovered during Christopher Wren's rebuilding of St Mary-le-Bow in 1671–73, following the Great Fire. Modern excavations date its construction to the winter from AD 47 to 48. Around London, it was 7.5–8.7 m (25–29 ft) wide and paved with gravel. It was repeatedly redone, including at least twice before the sack of London by Boudica's troops in 60 or 61. The road ran straight from the bridgehead on the Thames (Note: Although it is possible the Romans used a ferry prior to the expansion of Londinium in the rebuilding following Boudica's sack of the city in the year 60 or 61.) to what would become Newgate on the London Wall before passing over Ludgate Hill and the Fleet and dividing into Watling Street and the Devil's Highway west to Calleva (Silchester). Some of this route is preserved beneath Old Kent Road.

The 2nd-century Antonine Itinerary gives the course of Watling Street from "Urioconium" (Wroxeter) to "Portus Ritupis" (Richborough) as a part of its Second Route (Iter II), which runs for 501 MP from Hadrian's Wall to Richborough:

Route II of the Antonine Itinerary
...from the Wall to the port of Ritupis,		481 Roman miles,	thus:
From Blatobulgium	[Birrens]	to the scout camp [Netherby],	12
To Luguvalium	[Carlisle]		12
To Voreda	[Old Penrith]		14
To Bravoniacum	[Kirkby Thore]		13
To Verterae	[Brough]		13
To Lavatrae	[Bowes]		14
To Cataractonium	[Catterick]		16
Isurium	[Aldborough]		24
Eboracum	[York],	[6th Victorious Leg.],	17
To Calcaria	[Tadcaster]		9
To Cambodunum	[Slack]		20
To Mamucium	[Manchester]		18
To Condate	[Northwich]		18
To Deva	[Chester],	20th Vict. Leg.	20
To Bovium	[Tilston]		10
To Mediolanum	[Whitchurch, Shropshire]		20
To Rutunium	[Harcourt Park]		12
To Viroconium	[Wroxeter]		11
To Uxacona	[Redhill]		11
To Pennocrucium	[Penkridge]		12
To Letocetum	[Wall]		12
To Manduessedum	[Mancetter]		16
To Venonae	[High Cross]		12
To Bannaventa	[Norton]		17
To Lactodurum	[Towcester]		12
To Magiovinium	[Fenny Stratford]		17
To Durocobrivae	[Dunstable]		12
To Verulamium	[St Albans]		12
To Sulloniacae	[Stanmore]		9
To Londinium	[London]		12
To Noviomagus	[unknown]		10
To Vagniacae	[Springhead]		18
To Durobrivae	[Rochester]		9
To Durolevum	[unknown]		13
To Durovernum	[Canterbury]		12
To the port of Ritupis	[Richborough]		12

==== Battle of Watling Street ====
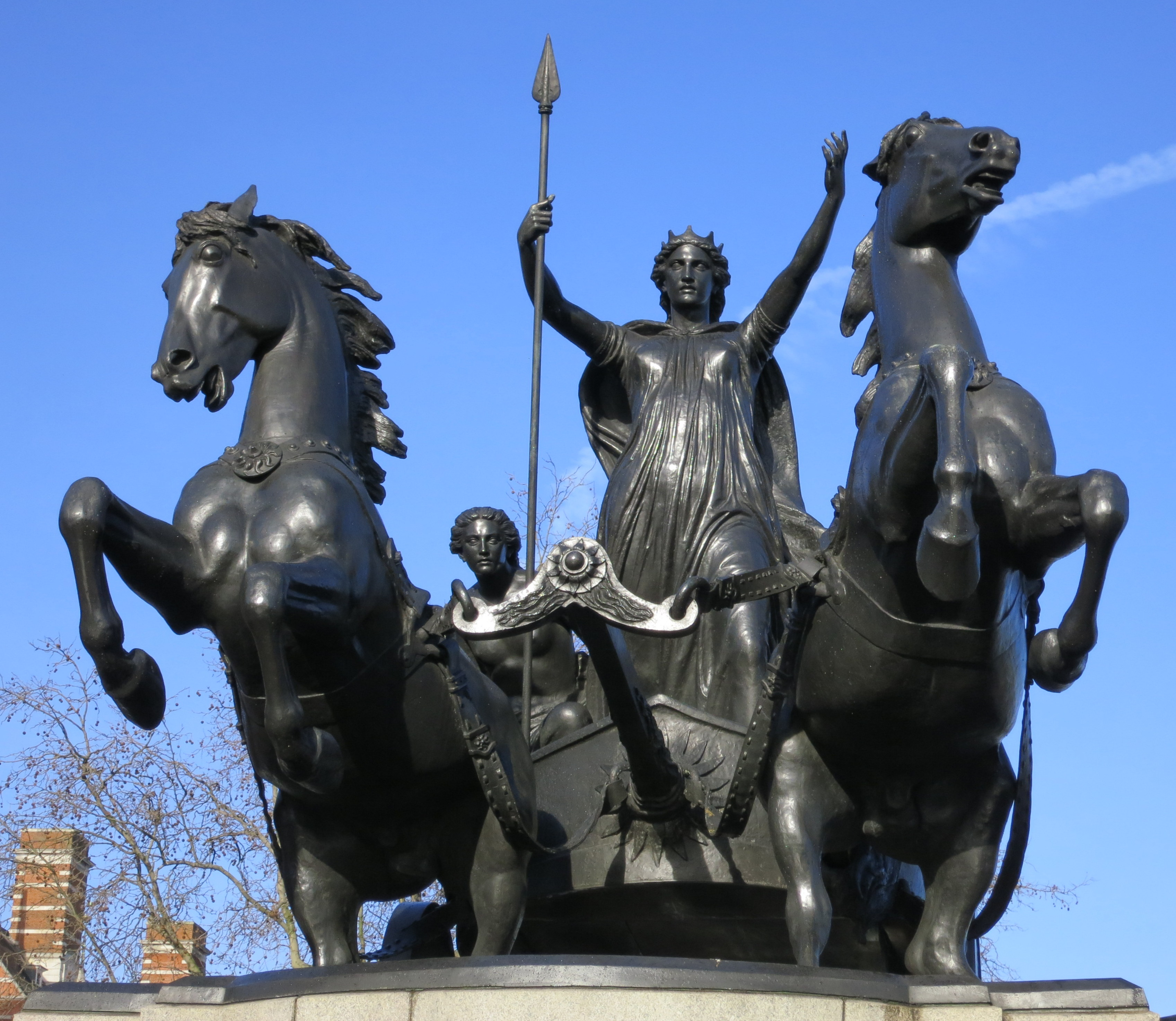
The statue Boadicea and Her Daughters by Thomas Thornycroft, near Westminster Pier, London

Some site in the middle section of this route is supposed by most historians to have been the location of G. Suetonius Paulinus's decisive victory over Boudica's Iceni in AD 61.

==== Subsidiary routes ====
The two routes of the Antonine Itinerary immediately following (Iter III & IV) list the stations from Londinium to "Portus Dubris" (Dover) and to "Portus Lemanis" (Lympne) at the north eastern edge of the Romney Marsh, suggesting that they may have been considered interchangeable terminuses. They only differ in the distance to Durovernum: 14 and 17 Roman miles, respectively. The route to Lemanis was sometimes distinguished by the name "Stone Street"; it now forms most of the B2068 road that runs from the M20 motorway to Canterbury. The route between Durovernum and the fortress and port at Regulbium (Reculver) on Kent's northern shore is not given in these itineraries but was also paved and is sometimes taken as a fourth terminus for Watling Street. The Sixth Route (Iter VI) also recorded an alternate path stopping at Tripontium (Newton and Biggin) between Venonis (High Cross) and Bannaventa (Norton); it is listed as taking 24 Roman miles rather than 17.

The more direct route north from Londinium (London) to Eboracum (York) was Ermine Street. The stations between Eboracum and Cataractonium (Catterick) were shared with Dere Street, which then branched off to the northeast. Durocobrivis (Dunstable) was the site of the path's intersection with the Icknield Way. The Maiden Way ran from Bravoniacum (Kirkby Thore) to the fort at Epiacum (Whitley Castle) with its remarkable ramparts, and on to the Hadrian's Wall fort of Magnis (Carvoran).

=== Saxon ===
A map illustrating the approximate extent of the Kingdom of Mercia in the 7th century, with the Forest of Arden nestled between the Rivers Severn, Avon, and Trent, and bordered to the north by Watling Street.

By the time of the Saxon invasions, the Roman bridge across the Thames had presumably fallen into disrepair or been destroyed. The Saxons abandoned the walled Roman site in favour of Lundenwic to its west, presumably because of its more convenient access to the ford on the Thames. They did not return to Lundenburh (the City of London) until forced to do so by the Vikings in the late 9th century. Over time, the graveling and paving itself fell into disrepair, although the road's course continued to be used in many places as a public right of way. "Watlingestrate" was one of the four roads (Latin: chemini) protected by the king's peace in the Laws of Edward the Confessor. (Note: The other three were "Fosse", "Hikenildestrate" (Icknield Street), and "Herningestrate" (Ermine Street).)

A number of Old English names testify to route of Watling Street at this time: Boughton Street in Kent; Colney Street in Hertfordshire; Fenny Stratford and Stony Stratford in Buckinghamshire; Old Stratford in Northamptonshire; Stretton-under-Fosse and Stretton Baskerville in Warwickshire. (The three adjacent settlements of All Stretton, Church Stretton, and Little Stretton in Shropshire; and Stretton Sugwas in Herefordshire have a Watling Street but they are not on the route).

Watling Street served as a significant traditional boundary for the ancient Forest of Arden, delineating its northern and western edges. The forest's other historical boundaries included Icknield Street to the east, the Salt Road (now the modern Alcester to Stratford Road) to the south, and the Fosse Way to the southeast.

=== Viking ===
Following the Viking invasions, the 9th-century Treaty of Alfred and Guthrum mentions Watling Street as a boundary.

=== Norman ===
Map of London around 1300 AD, showing Watling Street running north-west from London Bridge past Newgate

It is assumed that the pilgrims in Chaucer's Canterbury Tales used the southeastern stretch of Watling Street when journeying from Southwark to Canterbury.

=== Modernity ===
The first turnpike trust in England was established over Watling Street northwest of London by an act of Parliament, the Bedfordshire and Buckinghamshire Roads Act 1706 (6 Ann. c. 4), on 4 March 1707 in order to provide a return on the investment required to once more pave the road. The section from Fourne Hill north of Hockliffe to Stony Stratford was paved at a cost of £7000 (Note: About £1.5 million today.) over the next two years. Revenue was below expectations; in 1709, the trust succeeded in getting a new act extending the term of their monopoly but not permitting their tolls to be increased. In 1711, the trust's debts had not been discharged and the creditors took over receivership of the tolls. In 1716, a new act restored the authority of the trust under the supervision of another group appointed by the Buckinghamshire justices of the peace. The trust failed to receive a further extension of their rights in 1736 and their authority ended at the close of 1738. In 1740, a new act named new trustees to oversee the road, which the residents of Buckinghamshire described as being "ruined".

The road was again paved in the early 19th century at the expense of Thomas Telford. He operated it as a turnpike road for mail coaches from Ireland. To this purpose, he extended it to the port of Holyhead on Anglesey in Wales. During this time, the section southeast of London became known as the Great Dover Road. The tolls ended in 1875.

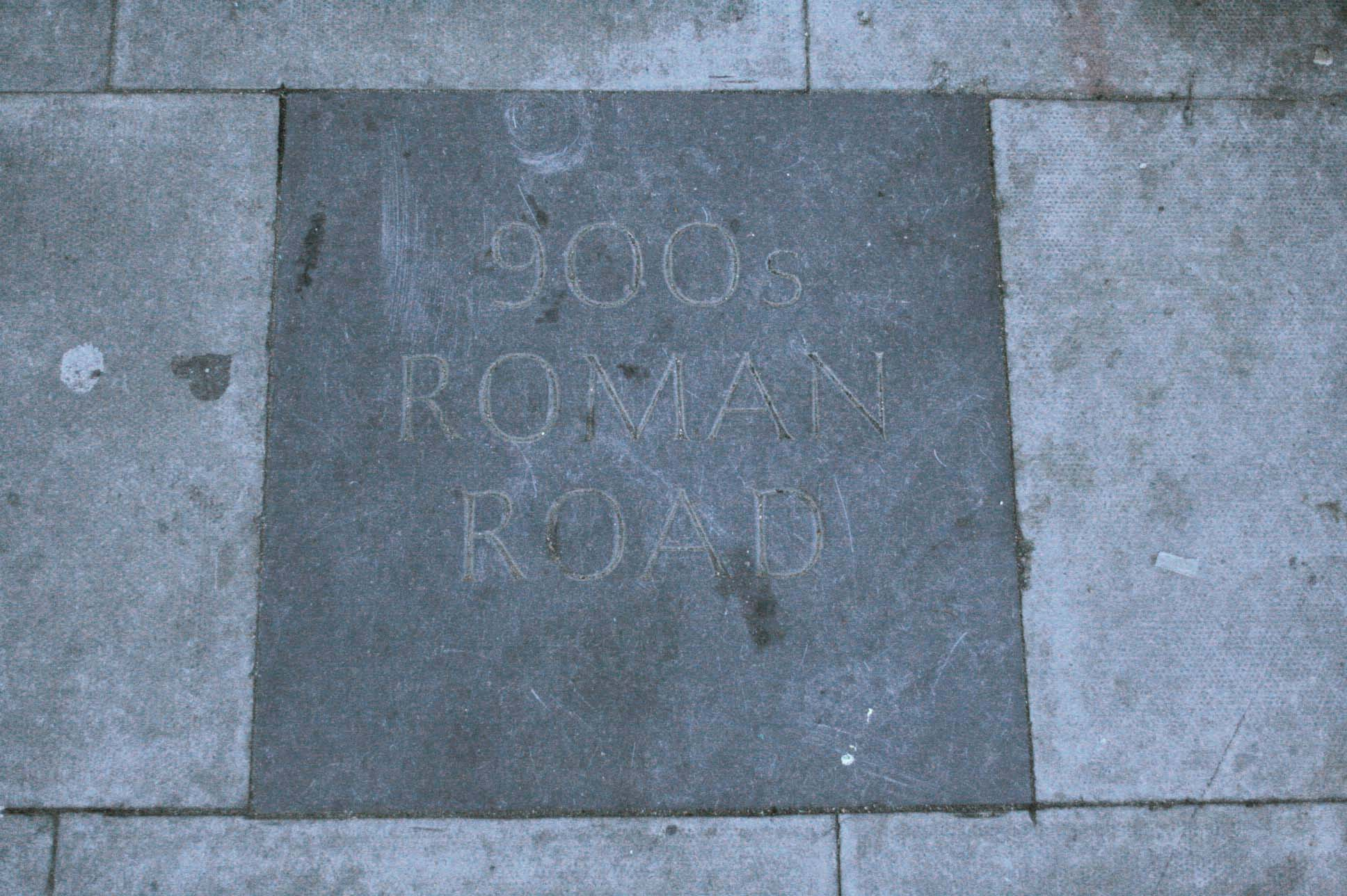
A paving stone on Kilburn High Road in London commemorates the route of Watling Street. (The date is incorrect.)

Much of the road is still in use today, apart from a few sections where it has been diverted. The A2 road between Dover and London runs over or parallel to the old path. A section of Watling Street still exists in the City of London close to Mansion House underground station on the route of the original Roman road which traversed the River Thames via the first London Bridge and ran through the City in a straight line from London Bridge to Newgate. The sections of the road in Central London possess a variety of names, including Edgware Road and Maida Vale. At Blackheath, the Roman road ran along Old Dover Road, turning and running through the area of present-day Greenwich Park to a location perhaps a little north of the current Deptford Bridge. North of London, the road is designated mainly as the A5 between London and Shrewsbury. At various points along the route, the A5 leaves the Roman road to bypass settlements, (Note: For example, through Milton Keynes, the A5 is diverted onto a new dual carriageway while Watling Street proper remains and forms part of the Milton Keynes grid road system.) but its historic route invariably remains evident even where motor traffic is restricted or banned.

The name Watling Street is still used along the ancient road in many places, for instance in Bexleyheath in southeast London and in Canterbury, Gillingham, Strood, Gravesend, and Dartford in Kent. North of London, the name Watling Street still occurs in Hertfordshire (including St Albans), Bedfordshire (Dunstable), Buckinghamshire (Milton Keynes), Northamptonshire (Towcester), Leicestershire (Hinckley), Warwickshire (Nuneaton and Atherstone) and in Staffordshire (Cannock, Wall, Tamworth and Lichfield). (There are Watling Streets in Shropshire (Church Stretton) and in Gwynedd (Llanrwst), but neither is on the original route.)

== Other Watling Streets ==
Dere Street, the Roman road from Cataractonium (Catterick in Yorkshire) to Corstopitum (now Corbridge, Northumberland) to the Antonine Wall, was also sometimes known as Watling Street. A third Watling Street was the Roman road from Mamucium (Manchester) to Bremetennacum (Ribchester) to Cumbria. Preston, Lancashire, preserved a Watling Street Road between Ribbleton and Fulwood, passing the Sharoe Green Hospital. Both of these may preserve a separate derivation from the Old English wealhas ("foreigner") or may have preserved the memory of the long Roman road while misattributing its upper stages to better-preserved roads. The Roman road between Deva Victrix (Chester) and Condate (Northwich) is also known locally as Watling Street.

== Gallery ==
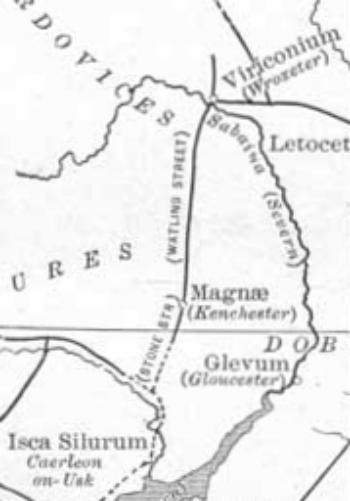
A detail from a 1910 map displaying the Welsh "Watling Street"

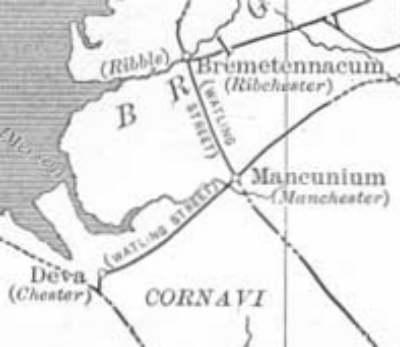
A detail from the same map displaying the Northwest "Watling Street"

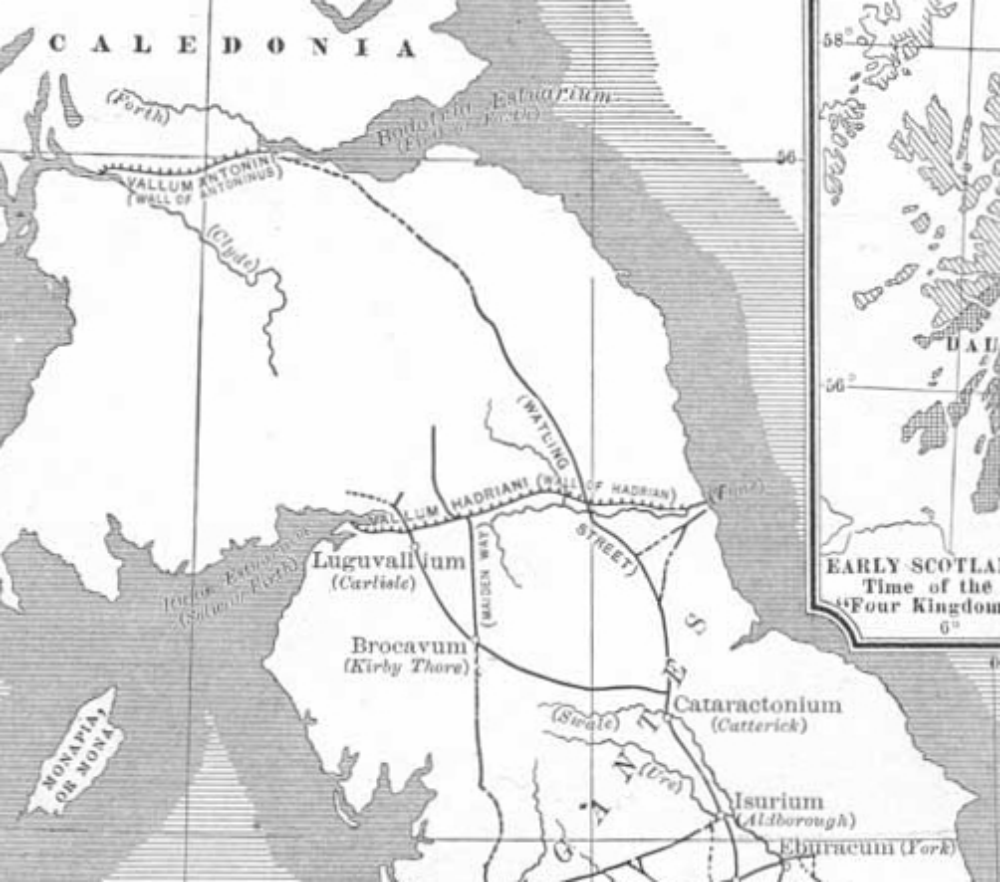
A detail from the same map misattributing Dere Street as "Watling Street"

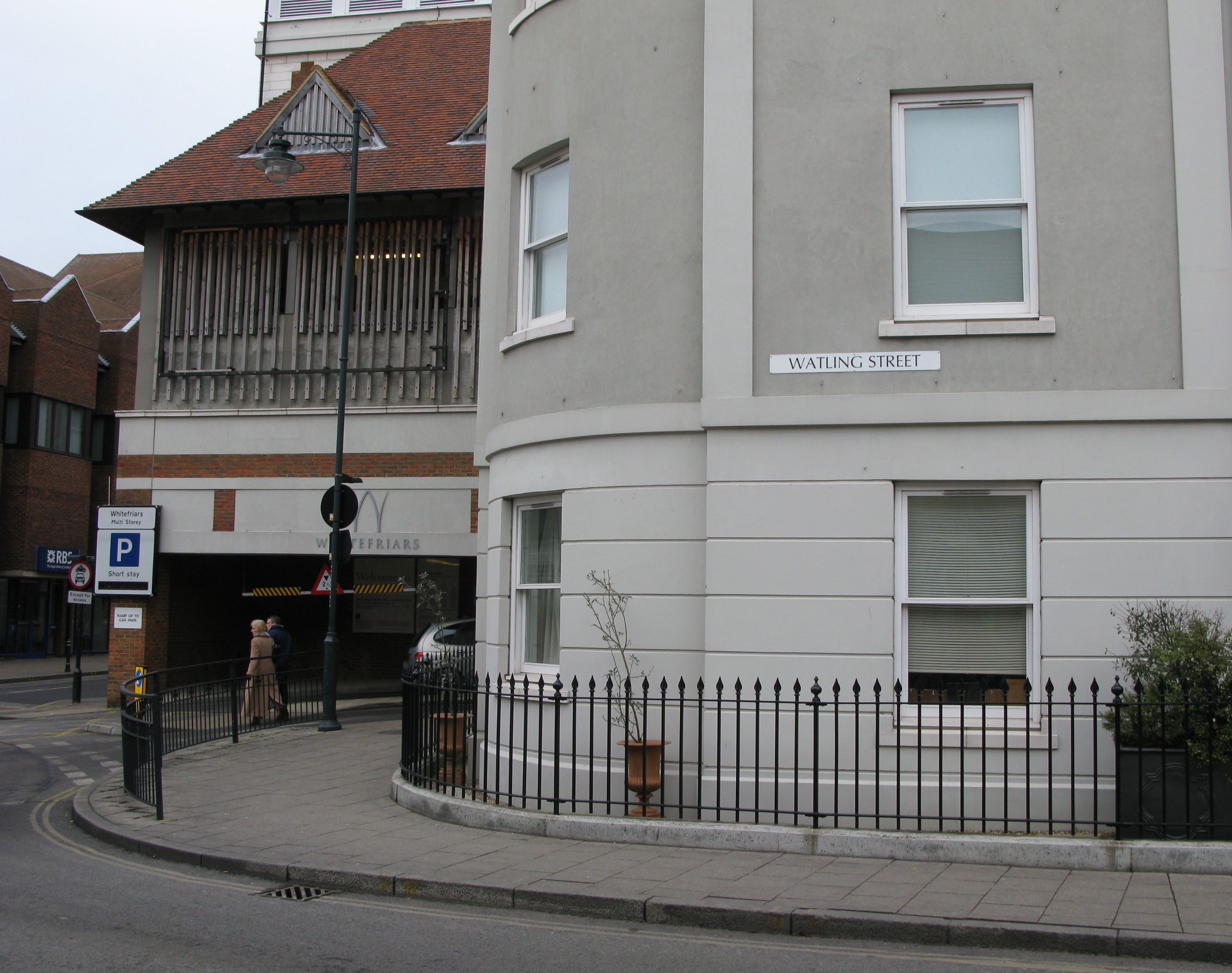
Modern Watling Street in Canterbury

== See also ==
- Roman Britain
- Roman roads in Britain
- The Widow of Watling Street, an apocryphal Shakespearean play
- Tollgate Hotel

== Bibliography ==
- Bishop, MC (2014). The Secret History of the Roman Roads of Britain. Barnsley: Pen & Sword. ISBN 978-1-84-884615-9.
- Margary, Ivan (1973), Roman Roads in Britain (3rd ed.), London: John Baker, ISBN 0212970011
- Roucoux, O. (1984), The Roman Watling Street: from London to High Cross, Dunstable Museum Trust, ISBN 0-9508406-2-9.
- John Higgs, (2017). Watling Street: Travels Through Britain and Its Ever-Present Past. Weidenfeld & Nicolson. ISBN 978-1-4746-0347-8
