= Roman roads in Britannia =

Roads in the Province of Britannia, 43–410

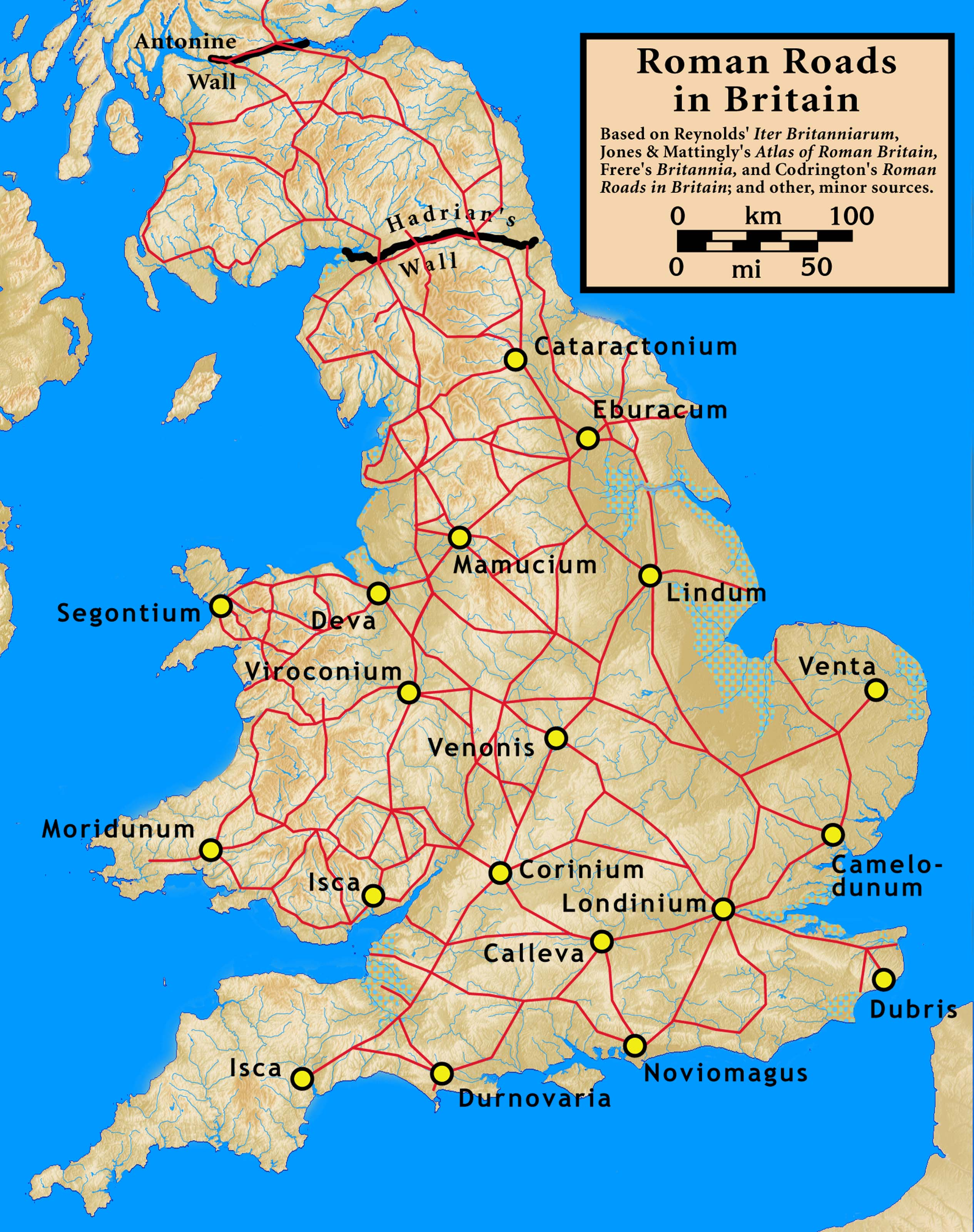
A map of Roman roads in Roman Britain

Roman roads in Britannia were initially designed for military use, created by the Roman army during the nearly four centuries (AD 43–410) that Britannia was a province of the Roman Empire.

It is estimated that about 2,000 mi (3,200 km) of paved trunk roads (surfaced roads running between two towns or cities) were constructed and maintained throughout the province. Most of the known network was complete by 180. The primary function of the network was to allow rapid movement of troops and military supplies, but it subsequently provided vital infrastructure for commerce, trade and the transportation of goods.

A considerable number of Roman roads remained in daily use as core trunk roads for centuries after the end of Roman rule in Britain in 410. Some routes are now part of the UK's national road network. Others have been lost or are of archeological and historical interest only.

After the Romans departed, systematic construction of paved highways in the United Kingdom did not resume until the early 18th century. The Roman road network remained the only nationally managed highway system within Britain until the establishment of the Ministry of Transport in the early 20th century.

== Overview ==
Prior to the Roman conquest of Britain, pre-Roman Britons mostly used unpaved trackways for travel. These routes, many of which had prehistoric origins, followed elevated ridge lines across hills, such as the South Downs Way. Although most routes were unpaved tracks, some British tribes had begun engineering roads during the first century BC.

Beginning in AD 43, the Romans quickly created a national road network. Engineers from the Roman army, in most cases, surveyed and built them from scratch. Key locations, both strategic and administrative, were connected by the most direct routes possible. Main roads were gravel or paved, had bridges constructed in stone or wood, and manned waypoints where travellers or military units could stop and rest.

The roads' impermeable design permitted travel in all seasons and weather. Following the withdrawal of the Roman legions in 410, the road system soon fell into disrepair. Large sections were abandoned and lost. Parts of the network were retained by the Anglo-Saxons, eventually becoming integral routes in Anglo-Saxon Britain.

== Historical development ==
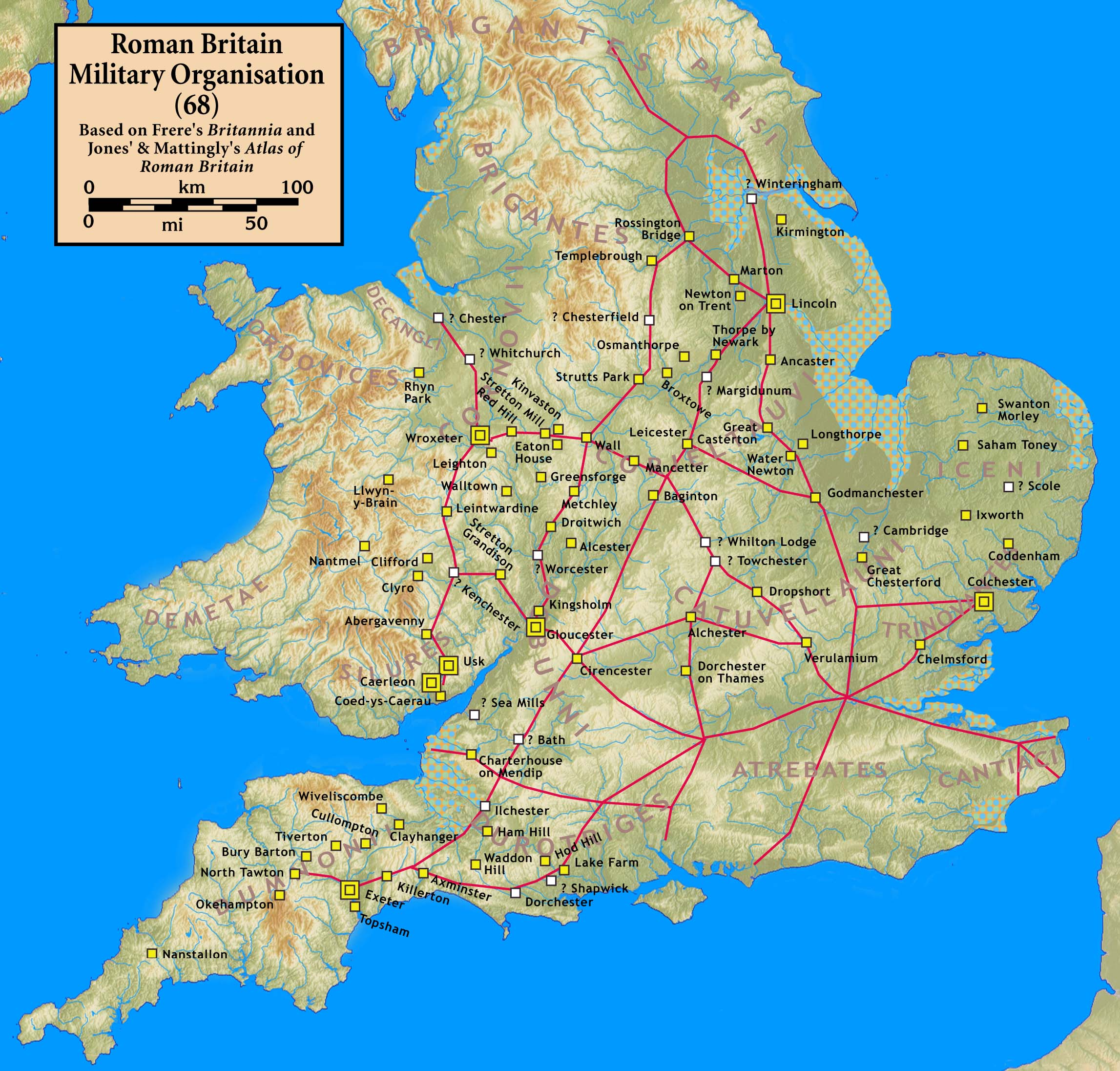
Roman Britain military infrastructure in 68 AD

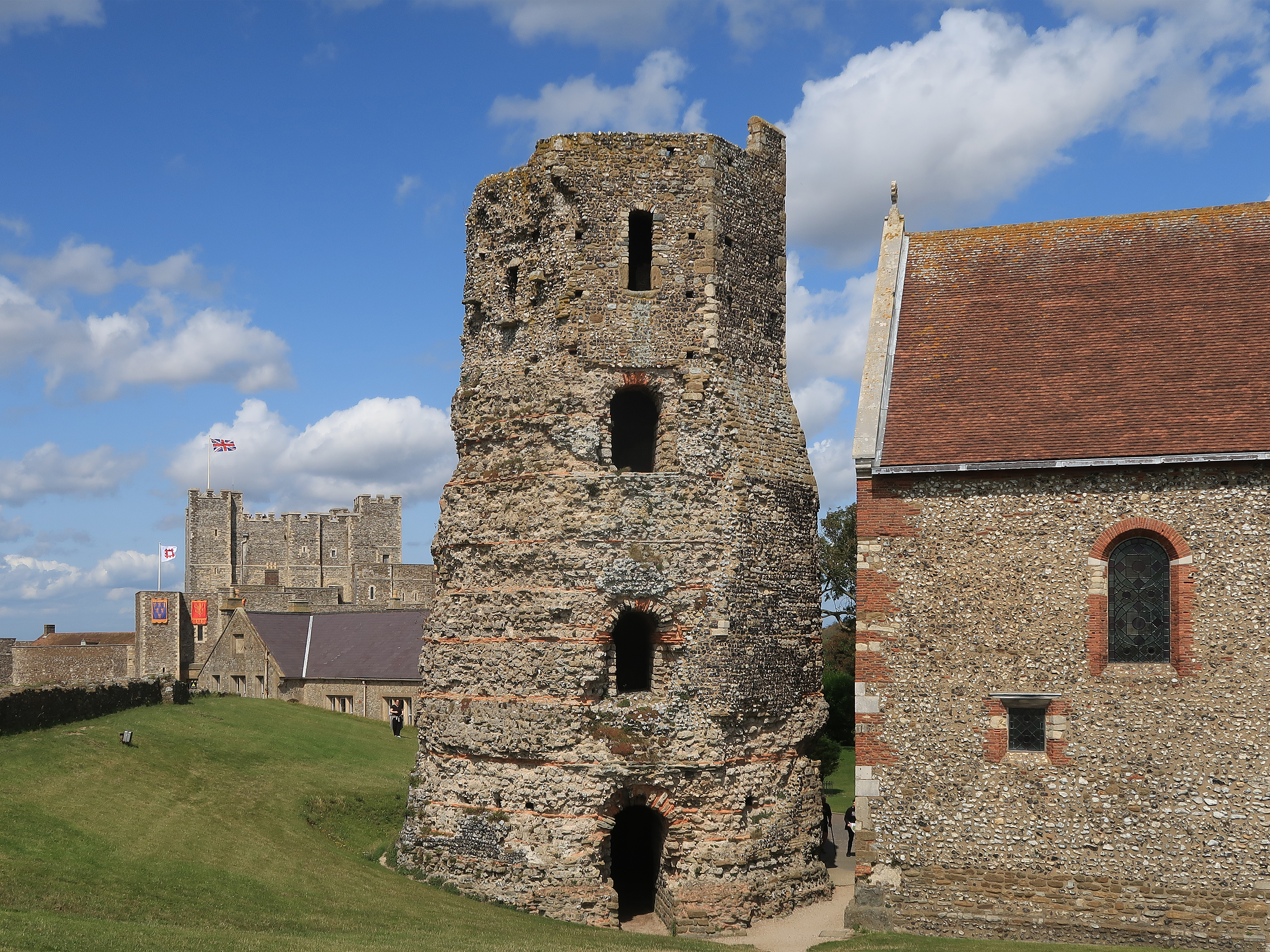
A Roman lighthouse at Dover Castle, 3rd century. Dubris was the starting point of Watling Street to London and Wroxeter

The earliest roads, built in the first phase of Roman occupation (the Julio-Claudian period, AD 43–68), connected London with the ports used in the invasion (Chichester and Richborough), and with the earlier legionary bases at Colchester, Lincoln (Lindum), Wroxeter (Viroconium), Gloucester and Exeter. The Fosse Way, from Exeter to Lincoln, was also built at this time to connect these bases with each other, marking the effective boundary of the early Roman province.

During the Flavian period (AD 69–96), the roads to Lincoln, Wroxeter and Gloucester were extended (by CE 80) to the legionary bases at Eboracum (York), Deva Victrix (Chester) and Isca Augusta (Caerleon). By 96, further extensions were completed from York to Corbridge, and from Chester to Luguvalium (Carlisle) and Segontium (Caernarfon) as Roman rule was extended over Cambria (Wales) and northern England (Brigantia). Stanegate, the military road from Carlisle to Corbridge, was built under the Emperor Trajan (ruled 98–117) along the line of the future Hadrian's Wall, which was constructed by his successor Hadrian in 122–132.

Scotland (Caledonia), including England north of Hadrian's Wall, remained mostly outside the boundaries of Britannia province, as the Romans never succeeded in subjugating the entire island, despite a serious effort to do so by governor Gnaeus Julius Agricola in 82–84. The Romans maintained a system of forts in the lowland region c. 80–220 to control the indigenous population beyond Hadrian's Wall and annexed the Lowlands briefly with the construction of the Antonine Wall in 164. This barrier, across the 'neck' of Scotland, from the Firth of Clyde to the Firth of Forth, was held for twenty years.

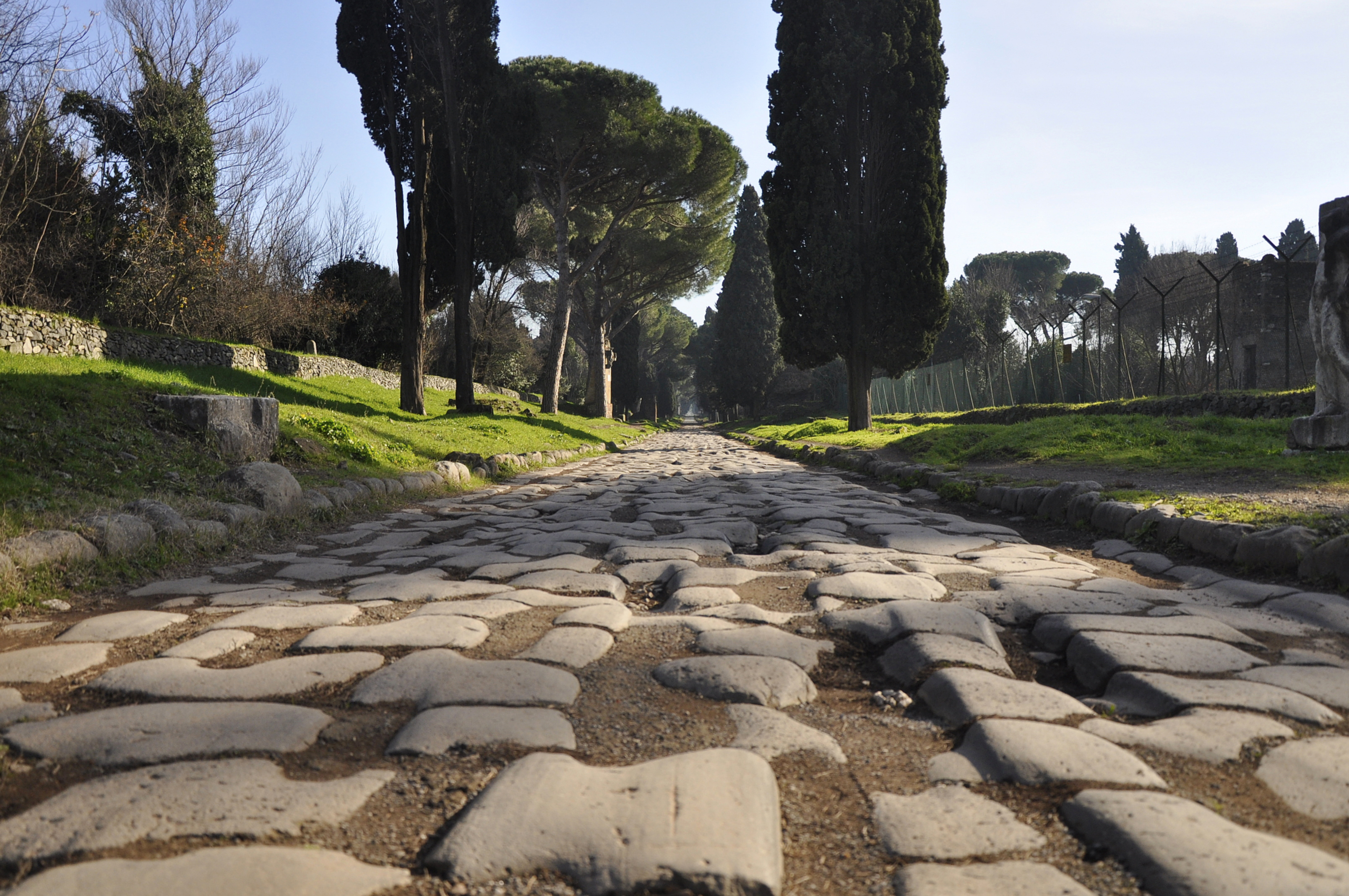
The Via Appia, near Rome, the oldest major Roman route in Italy, opened 312 BC

The Romans' main routes from Hadrian's Wall to the Antonine Wall, built by c. 120, were:

- Corbridge to the Roman fort at Cramond, Edinburgh (certain) and (likely) to Carriden (Veluniate) on the eastern end of the Antonine Wall, via High Rochester (Bremenium) and Melrose (Trimontium);
- Carlisle to Bothwellhaugh (certain) and (likely) to the Antonine.

There was also a certain road beyond the Antonine Wall to Perth (Bertha) from the Antonine fort at Falkirk. Indeed, it has been thought that the Roman road to the north of the Forth, to Stirling and Perth, dates from the expedition of Severus to beyond the Dee in 209; it may be doubted whether there was time in that campaign for such a work, and the road may well belong to a period before the construction of the Antonine Wall in 140.

The core network was complemented by a number of routes built primarily for commercial, rather than military, purposes.

Examples include: in Kent and Sussex, three certain roads leading from London to the important iron-mining area of the Weald; and in East Anglia, the road from Colchester to Norwich, Peddars Way and the Fen Causeway. These eastern and southern routes acquired military importance from the 3rd century onwards with the emergence of Saxon seaborne raiding as a major and persistent threat to the security of Britannia. These roads linked to the coastal defensive line of Saxon Shore forts such as Brancaster (Branodunum), Burgh Castle (Gariannonum) near Great Yarmouth, Lympne (Portus Lemanis) and Pevensey (Anderitum).

== Construction and maintenance ==
Standard Roman road construction techniques, long evolved on the Continent, were used. A road occupied a wide strip of land bounded by shallow ditches, varying in width from 86 pedes (25.5 m or 84 ft) on Ermin Way in Berkshire to 338 pedes (100 m or 330 ft) on Akeman Street in Oxfordshire. A trunk road in Britain would typically be 5–8 m (16–26 ft) in width, with a gauge of 7 m (23 ft) being the most common. Watling Street was 10.1 m (33 ft) wide while the Fosse Way was little more than half that. Several unnamed roads were wider than Watling Street, such as the Silchester to Chichester road at 11.2 m (37 ft).

In the centre a carriageway was built on a raised agger after stripping off soft topsoil, using the best local materials, often sand or sandy gravel. The two strips of ground between the agger and the boundary ditches were used by pedestrians and animals, and were sometimes lightly metalled. The agger was sometimes, but not always, bordered by deep ditches to take rainwater and keep the road structure as dry as possible.

The metalling was in two layers, a foundation of medium to large stones covered by a running surface, often a compacted mixture of smaller flint and gravel. About one quarter of road pavements were "bottomed" with large stones, mostly in the north and west where stone was more readily available. Some high-status roads in Italy were bound together by volcanic mortar, and a small minority of excavated sites in Britain have shown concrete or limestone mortar. Road surfaces in the iron-producing areas of the Weald were made from iron slag. The average depth of metalling over 213 recorded roads is about 51 cm (20 in), with great variation from as little as 10 cm (4 in) to up to 4 m (13 ft) in places, probably built up over centuries.

The main trunk roads were originally constructed by the Roman army. Responsibility for their regular repair and maintenance rested with designated imperial officials (the curatores viarum), though the cost would probably have been borne by the local civitas (county) authorities whose territory the road crossed. From time to time, the roads would be completely resurfaced and might even be entirely rebuilt, e.g. the complete reconstruction and widening of the Via Aemilia in northern Italy by the Emperor Augustus (reigned 27 BC – AD 14), two centuries after it was first built.

After the final withdrawal of Roman government and troops from Britain in 410, regular maintenance ended on the road network. Repairs became intermittent and based on ad hoc work. Despite the lack of any national management of the highways, Roman roads remained fundamental transport routes in England throughout the Early, High and Late Middle Ages. Systematic construction of paved highways did not resume until the building of the first turnpikes in the early 18th century.

== Archaeological evidence ==
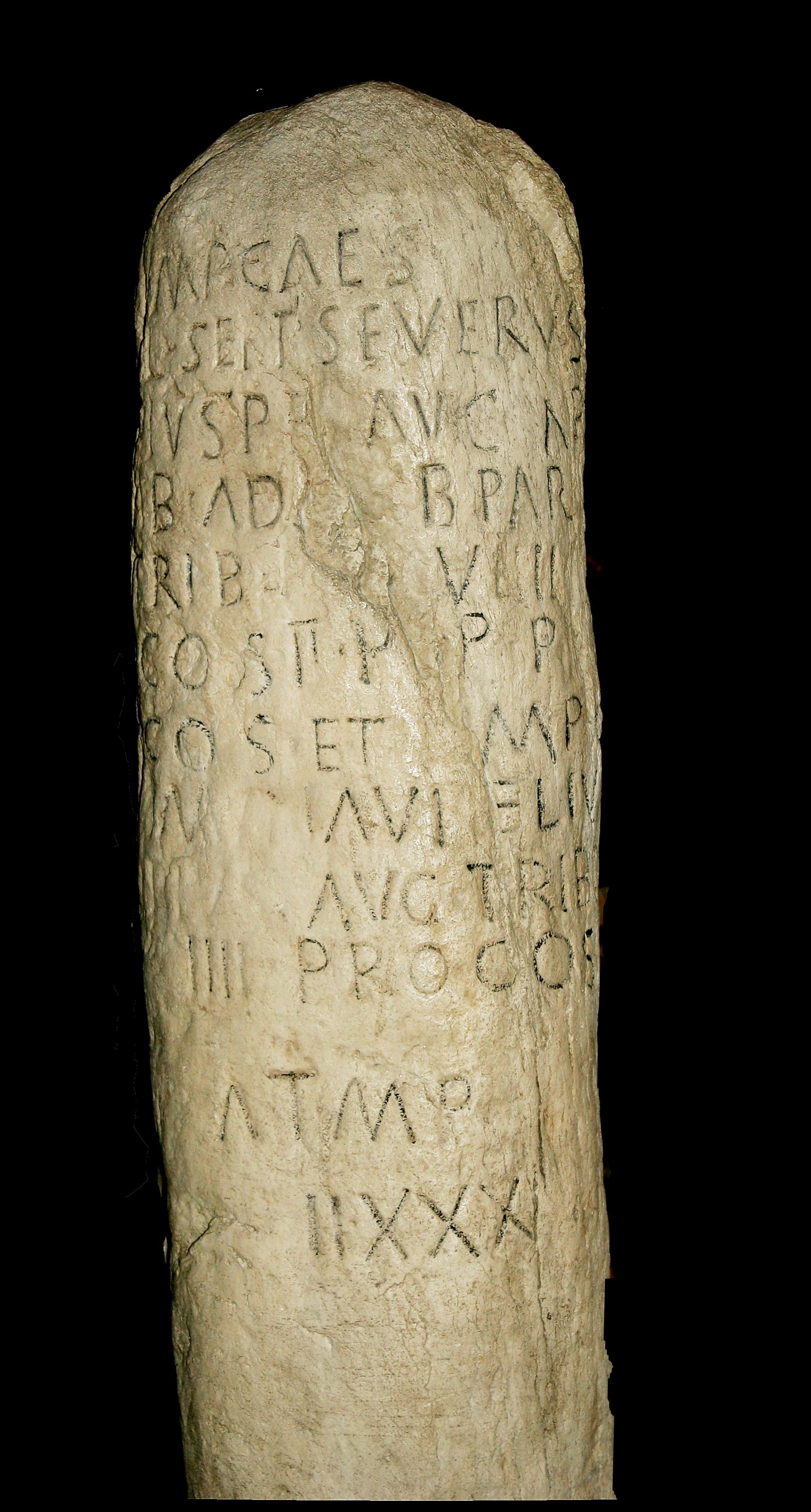
A Roman milestone from St Margarethen, Austria, dedicated in 201 to the Emperor Septimius Severus (ruled 193–212)

Extant remains of Roman roads are often much degraded or contaminated by later surfacing. Well-preserved sections of structures sometimes identified as Roman roads include Wade's Causeway in Yorkshire, and at Blackpool Bridge in the Forest of Dean, although their integrity as original Roman surfaces is not certain. In many places, Roman roads were built over in the 18th century to create the turnpikes. Where they have not been built over, many sections have been ploughed over by farmers and some stripped of their stone to use on turnpike roads.

There are numerous tracts of Roman road which have survived, albeit overgrown by vegetation, in the visible form of footpaths through woodland or common land, such as the section of Stane Street crossing Eartham Wood in the South Downs near Bignor (Sussex). This and others like it are marked on Ordnance Survey maps with dotted lines. Peddars Way in Norfolk is a Roman road converted into a long-distance footpath.

Wayside stations have been identified in Britain. Roman roads had regularly spaced stations along their length – the Roman equivalent of motorway service areas. Roughly every 4 mi (6.4 km) – the most a horse could safely be ridden hard – there would be a mutatio (literally: "a change"), essentially stables where mounted messengers could change horses and a tavern to obtain refreshment. Cavalrymen from auxiliary mixed infantry- and cavalry- regiments (cohortes equitatae) provided most of the army's despatch-riders (dispositi). Relays of fresh riders and horses careering at full gallop could sustain an average speed of about 20 mph (32 km/h). Thus an urgent despatch from the army base at York to London – 200 mi (320 km), a journey of over a week for a normal mounted traveller – could be delivered in just 10 hours. Because mutationes were relatively small establishments, and their remains ambiguous, it is difficult to identify sites with certainty.

Approximately every 12 mi (19 km) – a typical day's journey for an ox-drawn wagon – was a mansio (literally: "a sojourn", from which derive the English word "mansion" and French maison or "house"). This was a full-scale wayside inn, with large stables, tavern, rooms for travellers and even bath-houses in the larger establishments. Mansiones also housed detachments of troops, primarily auxiliaries, who regularly garrisoned and patrolled the roads along their whole length. These would check the identities, travel permits and cargoes of road users.

Mansiones may have housed the agents of the imperial procurator, the chief financial officer in the province, who collected the portorium, an imperial toll on goods in transit on public roads that was charged at 2 to 2 1/2 per cent of the value. The tax would be exacted when the goods crossed fixed toll points along the roads, which likely were located in or near mansiones. At least half a dozen sites have been positively identified as mansiones in Britain, e.g. the excavated mansio at Godmanchester (Durovigutum) on Ermine Street (near Huntingdon, Cambridgeshire).

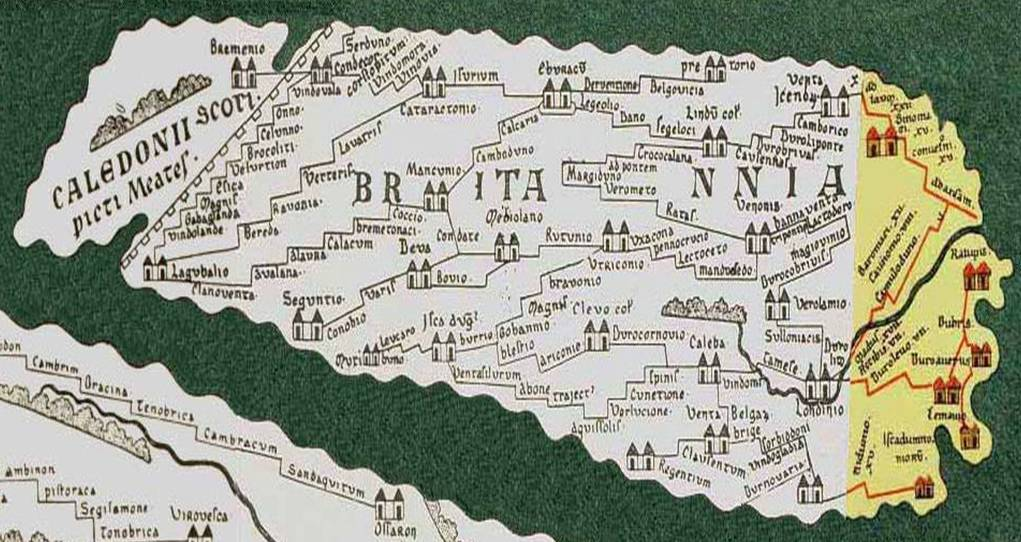
19th-century reconstruction of the British section of the Peutinger Table, a medieval copy of a probably Late Roman original map. The original section showing Roman Britain (Britannia) is lost.

Mutationes and mansiones were the key infrastructure for the cursus publicus (the imperial postal and transport system), which operated in many provinces of the Roman Empire. The cursus was primarily concerned with the carriage of government or military officers, government payload such as monies from tax collection and for military wages, and official despatches, but it could be made available to private individuals with special permission and for a fee. In Britain, the Vindolanda tablets, a series of letters written on wooden tablets to and by members of the garrison of Hadrian's Wall, show the operation of the cursus on the island.

Milestones, of which 95 are recorded in Roman Inscriptions of Britain. Most of these date from the later part of the Roman period (AD250 onwards), since it was the practice to replace a road's milestones when a major repair was carried out. Milestones were usually cylindrical and 2–4 m (6 ft 7 in – 13 ft 1 in) in height. Most contain only the customary dedication to the current Emperor and the number of miles to a particular destination. Only three provide additional information: two are dedicated by the public works departments of a civitas (county) (Dobunni) and a city (Lincoln), showing the involvement of local authorities in road maintenance; and the third records that the Emperor Caracalla (reigned 211–217) "restored the roads, which had fallen into ruin and disuse through old age".

Maps and Itineraries of the Roman era, designed to aid travellers, provide useful evidence of placenames, routes and distances in Britain. The most important is the Antonine Itinerary, dating from the later 3rd century, which contains 14 itineraries on the island.

== Road naming in post-Roman Britain ==
The main Roman roads in Britain c. 150 AD

The original names of the Roman roads in Britain are not known due to the lack of written and inscribed sources. This is in contrast to surviving routes in Italy and other Roman provinces within western Europe. In Britain, most major such routes bear Welsh, early Anglo-Saxon or later Middle English names, ascribed after the end of Roman rule in Britain (during the period known as the Early Middle Ages). This means that the toponym of a road is not based on the original Roman nomenclature for naming highways within Britannia Superior or Britannia Inferior.

For example, the Anglo-Saxons used the name Watlingestrate for the entire route from Dover/Portus Ritupis to Wroxeter, via Londinium (London); it is one of four former Roman roads (Latin: cammini) named as public rights of way under the Laws of Edward the Confessor in the early 11th century. (Note: The other three were "Fosse", "Hikenildestrate" (Icknield Street), and "Herningestrate" (Ermine Street).)

Official road names were usually taken from the Emperor in whose reign they were completed, such as the Via Traiana from Rome to Brindisi in southern Italy which was named after the Emperor Trajan (98–117). As the Dover to London section of Watling Street was begun in the years following the Roman invasion of Britain in 43, it may have been known to the Romano-Britons as the Via Claudia in honour of Emperor Claudius (41–54) who led the military campaign.

The only well-documented name which might be etymologically linked to an original Roman name is the Fosse Way between Exeter and Lincoln, which may derive from fossa, the Latin word for "ditch". But this is likely to be attributable to a popular, rather than official, Roman name for the route. Generally, those Roman roads in Britain which are named look to Anglo-Saxon giants and divinities. For instance, Wade's Causeway in North Yorkshire is taken from Wade of Germanic and Norse mythology.

English place names continue to reflect the settlement of Britain by the Anglo-Saxons. As these Germanic Pagan peoples advanced westward across the British isles, they encountered the decaying infrastructure of the former Roman Empire. Many settlements were founded on or near Roman roads (suffix -street e.g. Watling Street). The prefix strat-, strait-, streat- was employed to name settlements near these former imperial highways. Stretham means "homestead or village on a Roman road" and likewise Stretford means "ford on a Roman road".

== Main routes ==
The initial road network was built by the army to facilitate military communications. The emphasis was therefore on linking up army bases, rather than catering for economic flows. Thus, three important cross-routes were established connecting the major legionary bases by AD 80 as the frontier of the Roman-occupied zone advanced:

- Exeter (Isca) – Lincoln (Lindum)
- Gloucester (Glevum) – York (Eboracum)
- Caerleon (Isca) – York via Wroxeter (Viroconium) and Chester (Deva)

Later a large number of other cross-routes and branches were grafted onto this basic network.

After Boudica's Revolt, London (Londinium) commanded the major bridge across the Thames connecting the final northern and western legionary bases with the Kentish ports communicating with Boulogne (Gesoriacum) and the rest of the Empire. Six core roads were constructed tying the new capital to the existing network. Ignoring their later English names, they are as follows:

- London – Canterbury (Durovernum). At Canterbury, this route split into 4 major branches to the major Roman ports:
  - Canterbury – Richborough Castle (Rutupiae)
  - Canterbury – Dover (Portus Dubris)
  - Canterbury – Lympne (Portus Lemanis)
  - Canterbury – Reculver (Regulbium)
- London – Chichester (Noviomagus), a port
- London – Silchester (Calleva Atrebatum). At Silchester, this route split into 3 major branches:
  - Silchester – Portchester (Portus Adurni), a port, via Winchester (Venta) and Southampton (Clausentum)
  - Silchester – Old Sarum (Sorviodunum), offering connections to Exeter and Dorchester (Durnovaria)
  - Silchester – Caerleon, base of the 2nd legion, via Gloucester
- London – Chester, base of the 20th legion, via St Albans (Verulamium), Lichfield (Letocetum), and Wroxeter and with continuation to Carlisle (Luguvalium) on Hadrian's Wall
- London – York, base of the 9th and 6th legions, via Lincoln and with continuation to Corbridge (Coria) on Hadrian's Wall
- London – Colchester (Camulodunum), with continuation to Caistor St Edmund (Venta)

=== List of Roman Roads and modern numberings ===
Roman road	Approximate distance	Route	Via	Counterpart modern roads^{A}
Ackling Dyke	22 miles 35 km	Old Sarum (Sorviodunum) to Badbury Rings	Cranborne Chase	A354 at Woodyates
Akeman Street (1)	78 miles 126 km	St Albans (Verulamium) to Cirencester (Corinium)	Bicester (Alchester)	A41 from Bicester to Tring
Akeman Street (2)	76 miles 123 km	Wimpole to Brancaster (Branodunum)	Cambridge (Duroliponte)	A603 from Wimpole to Cambridge then A10 to Ely
Batham Gate		Buxton (Aquae Arnemetiae) to Templebrough	Brough-on-Noe (Navio)	B6049 Bradwell, Derbyshire
Cade's Road	100 miles 160 km	Brough (Petuaria) to Newcastle upon Tyne (Pons Aelius)	York (Eboracum); Thirsk; Stockton; Sadberge; Sedgefield; Chester-le-Street (Concangis); Gateshead	A1034/1079 Brough-York
Dere Street	180 miles 290 km	York (Eboracum) to Antonine Wall at Carriden (Veluniate)	Catterick (Cataractonium); Binchester (Bishop Auckland; Vinovia); Corbridge (Coria) on Hadrian's Wall	A59 York to A1(M)
Devil's Causeway	55 miles 90 km	Hadrian's Wall/Dere Street to Berwick-upon-Tweed	Hartburn, Powburn, Lowick	Stretches of the A697
Devil's Highway		London (Londinium) to Silchester (Calleva)	London (Londinium); Staines (Pontes); Silchester (Calleva)	Short stretches of the A30 and A315
Ermin Way	68 miles 77 km	Silchester (Calleva) to Gloucester (Glevum)	Gloucester (Glevum); Cirencester (Corinium); Silchester (Calleva); the Devil's Highway	B4000 Newbury to Stratton, Swindon, A419 Stratton, Swindon to Cirencester, A417 Cirencester to Gloucester
Ermine Street	200 miles 322 km	London (Londinium) to York (Eboracum)	Godmanchester (near Huntingdon; Durovigutum); Water Newton (Peterborough; Durobrivae); Lincoln (Lindum)	A10 London-Royston; A1198 Royston-Huntingdon; A15 Lincoln-Broughton; A1034/1079 Brough-York
Fen Causeway	90 miles 145 km	Water Newton (Peterborough; Durobrivae) to Brampton, Norfolk	Denver, Norfolk	A1122 Downham Market-Swaffham
Ffordd Fleming	67 miles 107 km	Pumsaint (Luentinum) to St David's (Menevia/Menapia)		Fishguard to Bangor Trunk Road
Fosse Way	220 miles 354 km	Exeter (Isca Dumnoniorum) to Lincoln (Lindum)	Ilchester (Lindinis), Bath (Aquae Sulis), Cirencester (Corinium), Leicester (Ratae)	A37 Ilchester-Shepton Mallet; A429 Cirencester-Halford; B4455 Halford-High Cross; A46 Leicester-Lincoln
The Great Road		London (Londinium’s Aldgate) to Colchester (Camulodunum)	London (Londinium’s Aldgate); Colchester (Camulodunum); Pye Road	
Hen Ffordd	24 miles 38 km	Pumsaint (Luentinum) to Carmarthen (Maridunum)		
Icknield Street; Ryknild Street^{B}	125 miles 200 km	Bourton-on-the-Water (near Stow-on-the-Wold) to Templeborough (near Rotherham, Yorkshire)	Alcester; Metchley (Birmingham); Lichfield (Letocetum); Derby (Derventio)	B4085 and A435 in Warwickshire, A38 Lichfield-Derby
King Street	40 miles 64 km	Water Newton (Peterborough; Durobrivae) to South Kesteven, Lincolnshire	Lolham	Short stretch of the A15
Maiden Way	20 miles 32 km	Kirkby Thore (Bravoniacum) to Carvoran (Magnae)	Kirkby Thore (Bravoniacum); Whitley Castle (Epiacum); Carvoran (Magnae)	The Pennine Way follows the route over Lambley Common
Military Way	73 miles 117 km	Wallsend (Newcastle upon Tyne; Segedunum) to Bowness-on-Solway (Maia)	Built as a supply route for Hadrian's Wall, just to the south of it via Housesteads	None
Peddars Way	47 miles 76 km	Holme-next-the-Sea (near Hunstanton, Norfolk) to Knettishall Heath (near Thetford, Norfolk)	Castle Acre	None
Port Way; Portway	133 miles 214 km	Silchester (Calleva) to Weymouth	Dorchester (Durnovaria); Old Sarum (Sorviodunum, Old Salisbury); Silchester (Calleva); the Devil's Highway	None
Pye Road		Caistor St Edmund (Venta Icenorum) to Colchester (Camulodunum)	Caistor St Edmund (Venta Icenorum); Colchester (Camulodunum); the Great Road	A140 road
Sarn Helen	100 miles (160 km)	Aberconwy (Canovium) to Carmarthen (Moridunum)	Betws-y-Coed, Trawsfynydd (Tomen y Mur), Bremia, Bronant, Dolaucothi, Llandovery (Alabum)	A470; A487; A470; A483
Stane Street (1)	57 miles 91 km	London to Chichester (Noviomagus)	Morden, Ewell, Dorking, Billingshurst, Pulborough, Bignor	A3 Newington-Clapham; A24 Clapham-Ewell; A29 Rowhook-Pulborough; A285 Halnaker-Chichester
Stane Street (2)	39 miles (63 km)	Braughing to Colchester (Camulodunum)		B1256 Bishop's Stortford-Braintree; A120 Braintree-Colchester
Stanegate	44 miles 71 km	Carlisle (Luguvalium) to Corbridge (Coria)	South of Hadrian's Wall, which it predated, via Vindolanda	None
Stone Street	15 miles 24 km	Canterbury (Durovernum) to Lympne		B2068 from the M20 motorway to Canterbury
Via Devana^{C}	31 miles 49.88 km	Colchester to Chester	Colchester (Camulodunum), Wixoe, Cambridge (Duroliponte), Huntingdon/Godmanchester, Corby, Medbourne, Leicester (Ratae Corieltauvorum), Mancetter (Manduessedum), Water Eaton (Pennocrucium), Newport, Whitchurch (Mediolanum), Chester (Deva Victrix)	Worsted Street, or Wool Street, from Wixoe to Cambridge. A1307 from Cambridge to Godmanchester
Wade's Causeway^{D}	Up to 25 miles Up to 40 km	Dunsley Bay to Malton, North Yorkshire		None
Watling Street	200 miles 322 km	The Kentish ports to Wroxeter (Viroconium)	Richborough (Rutupiae) or Dover (Dubris); Canterbury (Durovernum); London (Londinium); St Albans (Verulamium); Wall (Letocetum); Wroxeter (Viroconium); sometimes continued to Birrens (Blatobulgium) or conflated with Dere Street or continued south to Magnae (Kenchester) or extended north to Bremetennacum (Ribchester)	A2 Faversham-Gillingham; A207 Crayford-Blackheath; A5 London-Wroxeter (except bypasses)

- A.Sections of modern road that lie directly above the Roman road. Such stretches are marked "ROMAN ROAD" on Ordnance Survey Maps.
- B.Not to be confused with Icknield Way, a pre-Roman trackway from Buckinghamshire to Norfolk. Although the known road ends at Templeborough, it almost certainly continued to Doncaster (Danum) to join a branch of Ermine Street to York.
- C.This is not a Saxon name, but a Latin one invented by 18th century antiquarians to define a putative route. It amounts to just a series of cross routes to reach Watling Street from Colchester.
- D. This a sinuous, linear monument that might be up to 6,000 years old in the North York Moors national park. Its stone course is only 1 mile (1.6 km) long on Wheeldale Moor but the inclusion of other stretches create a 25-mile (40 km) section. Its provenance as a Roman Road is an ongoing academic study.

== See also ==
- Margary numbers
