= William Bainbridge (barrister) =

British lawyer

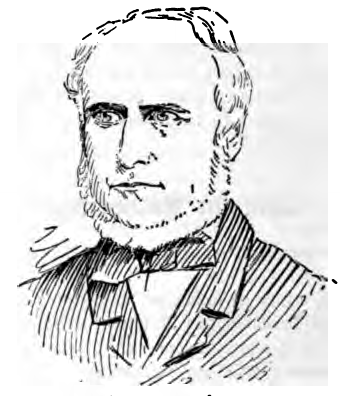
- Born: 10 February 1811; Alston, Cumbria, England
- Died: 13 December 1869 (aged 58); Cliff House, Cullercoats, England
- Resting place: Alston Cemetery, Alston, Cumbria, England
- Education: Inner Temple
- Occupations: Lawyer; barrister
- Political party: Liberal
- Father: William

William Bainbridge (10 February 1811 – 13 December 1869) was a British lawyer and barrister, a resident of Newcastle upon Tyne in the 19th-century well known for his legal work, political opinions and antiquarian and literary interests.

== Biography ==
William Bainbridge was born at Alston on 10 February 1811, the only son of William, second partner in the firm of Robert & William Bainbridge, old established solicitors in that town. He received his education at a North-country school, became a student at the Inner Temple, and was called to the Bar in 1838.

He elected, a few appearances aside, not to act as a barrister on the Northern Circuit and instead established a chamber practice in Newcastle, first in Grey Street, and afterwards in Westgate Street, as a conveyancer and real property lawyer, an area in which he had the good fortune to acquire considerable celebrity. Soon after Mr. Bainbridge commenced practice, he issued a book, which his experience in the mining districts of Alston particularly qualified him to write, A Practical Treatise on the Law of Mines and Minerals (1841).

Bainbridge followed up his treatise on mining law by publishing A Letter to Sir Robert Peel on Church Leases (1841); The Mayor and the Monks of Tynemouth (1843); contributing to the Legendary Division of Richardson's Local Historians' Table-Book a ballad entitled The Monk of Tynemouth and the Lord of Delaval, founded on the old tradition of the Monk's Stone (1844); delivering a lecture at the Literary and Philosophical Society of Newcastle on Peter the Hermit — the first Crusader (1850); and contributing to the Archaeologia Aeliana an Account of the Roman Road, called the Maiden Way, from Caervoran, and over the Cross Fell range, to Kirkby Thore (1851). He published, also, A Comparison of the great English and French Revolutions, together with a book of poetry, entitled Alpine Lyrics, and a three-volume novel, Lionel Merval. His principal literary achievement was a book bearing the curious title of The Day After To-Morrow, containing the Opinions of Mr. Sergeant Mallet, M.P. for Boldborough, on the Future State of the British Nation, and of the Human Race. Edited by William de Tyne, of the Inner Temple (1858). Under the guise of a tale, where every chapter is introduced by a description of rural scenery or wild romantic country, the three or four characters in this drama argue out the moral, social, religious, and political questions of the time.

Bainbridge married a daughter of Mr. Thomas Chater, solicitor, Newcastle, and for some years lived at Wallsend. During his residence there, the inhabitants of the parish were in a state of fermentation on church matters, which led to a misunderstanding between the churchwardens and the incumbent. In this Bainbridge took a prominent part, and he was put forward as the champion of the popular party against ecclesiastical authority. The usual result took place; both parties exhausted themselves, and the question was left much where it was when the fray began.

Leaving Wallsend in 1854, Mr. Bainbridge purchased Cliff House, Cullercoats, from the Arkwright family.

Bainbridge acted as one of four executors after the collapse of the Northumberland and District Bank. The arduous and harassing work involved in long-protracted litigation and adjustment of conflicting claims of creditors and share-holders had a visible effect upon his health, but he discharged the matters arising to general satisfaction.

In politics Bainbridge was an advanced Liberal, a vocal critic of municipal administration in Newcastle, and an advocate of Parliamentary Reform. Richard Welford comments that "he did not shrink from avowing and maintaining, both with tongue and pen, the soundness of his opinions, when such opinions were far from popular amongst his profession or his class".

At the contested election for Newcastle, in March, 1857, he proposed Mr. Peter Carstairs, who was a defeated candidate in a sharp contest with Messrs. Headlam and Ridley. In December, 1860, he proposed the same candidate in opposition to Mr. Somerset A. Beaumont, and was again doomed to see his man beaten. Eight years afterwards he once more appeared upon the hustings in Newcastle, this time to second the nomination of Joseph Cowen, shortly after the passing of the Reform Act 1867. In the course of his speech on that occasion he said:

There was no question that the present was one of the most important crises in the history of England; that the institutions of the land were about to be reviewed by the people, who, like the heir come to his majority, looked over their estate to see whether all was in good order and good condition. There was no institution, however venerable, that would not be put upon its trial, and it would be for the people themselves, guided by the wisdom of their rulers, to say whether one or the other was capable of repair; or whether it ought to cease to exist, and be cut down like a withered tree bearing neither flowers nor fruit

Besides speaking upon the hustings, Mr. Bainbridge, at the public meetings which were held in the town in connection with these elections, raised his voice with earnestness and effect in favour of the Radical candidates.

Bainbridge threw himself with characteristic fervour into a fierce controversy which raged in Newcastle when the vicar of Newcastle, Clement Moody, was appointed to the Mastership of the Mary Magdalene Hospital. He spoke at public meetings against the appointment, and when, in December, 1856, a Charity Commission Inspector came down to hold a public inquiry on the subject, he led the way in demanding that the Hospital should be reconstituted for the benefit of the sick and indigent poor. His services on that occasion form the theme of laudation in a famous satire The High Priest of Epona, written by a gifted townsman in imitation of Thomas Babington Macaulay's Lays of Ancient Rome.

When the British Association came to Newcastle in 1863, Bainbridge, who was a Fellow of the Geological Society, read a paper On the Pennine Fault in connection with the Volcanic Rocks at the foot of Crossfell; and with the Tynedale Fault called The Ninety Fathom Dyke. This latter formation, which extends from Cullercoats, where he resided, to the Vale of Alston, in which he was born, was always an attractive subject of discussion with him.

If Bainbridge's political opinions had been less advanced, and less pronounced, he would, according to Welford, probably have been given a position in the administration of the law worthy of his great abilities. For many years, whenever a vacancy occurred among County Court Judges, his fellow-townsmen assigned to him the post. But that promotion never came, and the only honour he received from Liberal Governments was that of a Justice of the Peace for the County of Northumberland.

Bainbridge died at Cliff House, Cullercoats, on 13 December 1869, and was buried in Alston Cemetery. "Lawyer Bainbridge," as he was familiarly called, was remembered by Welford as "a powerful and fervent speaker, with a fine command of nervous and idiomatic English, a good voice, an imposing presence, and a thorough conviction of the truth of the doctrines he was advocating, a formidable opponent and an efficient ally".
