= Verterae =

Roman fort in Brough, Cumbria, England

- Brough, Cumbria, England
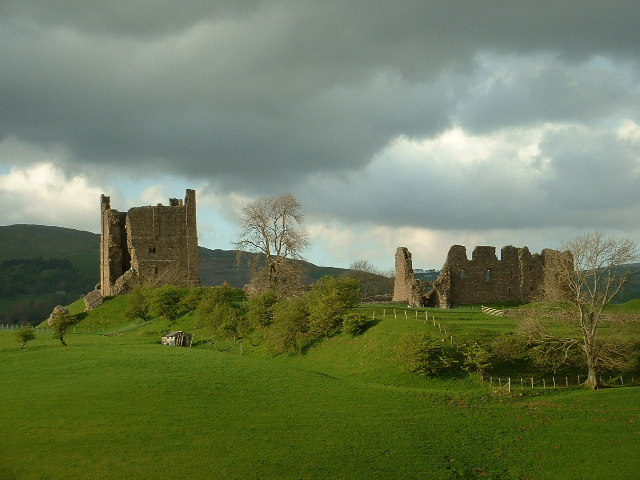
- Part of the Roman earthworks, incorporated into the later Brough Castle.

Site information
- Type: Castra
- Condition: Earthworks only survive

Location
- Coordinates: 54°31′34″N 2°19′06″W

Site history
- Built: 1st century AD

Verterae, or Verteris, was a Roman fort in the modern-day village of Brough, Cumbria, England. Occupied between the 1st and 5th centuries AD, it protected a key Roman road in the north of England. In the 11th century, Brough Castle was built on part of the site by the Normans. Archaeologists explored the remains during the 20th century, and it is now protected under UK law.

== Etymology ==
The name Verterae, or Verteris, is of Brittonic origin, and derived from the element werther, a plural form meaning either "ramparts" or "high places" (Middle Welsh gwarther). ‘Ferter’ and Fortriu in Scotland may be derived from the same element.

== Roman period ==
Verterae was probably built by the Roman governor Gnaeus Julius Agricola between AD 79-80, as part of his campaign to conquer the north of Britain. The name meant "the Forts", and it served as a waypoint on the northern leg of the Roman road connecting the Roman towns of Luguvalium with Eboracum – the modern-day cities of Carlisle and York – and points further south. One of a sequence of forts that lay every 12 miles (19 km) to 14 miles (23 km) along the route, the site protected the Stainmore Pass that stretched from the River Eden across the Pennines. The route is a major artery to this day, carrying the A66 across the Pennines.

The rectangular fort was 3-acre (1.2 ha) in size, constructed on a ridge overlooking the Swindale Beck. The size of the fort is uncertain, due to later work on the site, but it may have been approximately 100 by 110 metres (330 by 360 ft) across east to west, with a ditch up to 15 metres (49 ft) and 6 metres (20 ft) deep in places. A settlement called a vicus and cemetery was constructed on the east side of the fort. The vicus included both stone and wattle-and-daub buildings.

Around the time of the late 4th century and early 5th century, an auxiliary unit called the Numerus Directorum, around 300-400 strong, were based in the fort.

== Maiden Castle ==
The remains of a Roman fortlet known as Maiden Castle, lie 8 km east of Verterae at NY 87212 13150. Maiden Castle here guards the western approach to the summit of the Stainmore Pass. Old gazetteers claim this fort gave its name to the Maiden Way – the old Roman road from nearby Bravoniacum (Kirkby Thore) north to Magnae (Carvoran) on Hadrian's Wall.

== Post-Roman period ==
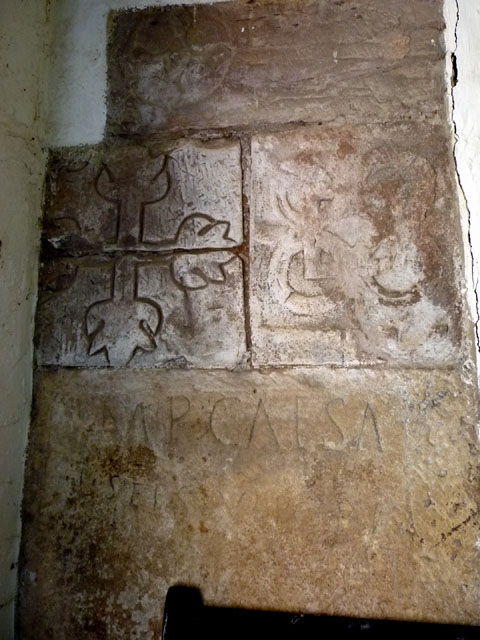
Inscribed stones from Verterae, in the south porch of St Michael's Church in Brough, Cumbria.

Verterae was occupied for a time after the Roman withdrawal around the year 410 but was eventually abandoned. In the 11th century, a Norman castle was built within the ruined walls of the fort. In the 16th century the antiquarian William Camden rediscovered the link between the location and the Roman occupation, arguing that this site, by then called Brough, was the Roman fort of Verterae.

Rubbish from the Roman period was discovered on the site in the mid-19th century, and archaeological excavations were carried out in 1923 by the government. More excavations followed in 1954 and during the 1970s and 1990s, with a comprehensive survey of the site being conducted in 1996. The area of the fort, covering the medieval castle, Brough Castle Farm and the surrounding lands, is protected under UK law as a Scheduled Ancient Monument.

== Bibliography ==
- Gaskill, Nicola; Noakes, Helen; Woods, Frances (2009). An Archaeological Watching Brief and Investigation at Brough Castle, Church Brough, Cumbria (PDF). Alston, UK: North Pennines Archaeology.
- Gordon, Seton (1949). Highways and Byways in the Central Highlands. London, UK: Macmillan & Co. Archived from the original on 19 February 2015.
- Noakes, Helen (2008). An Archaeological Field Evaluation at Brough Castle, Church Brough, Cumbria (PDF). Alston, UK: North Pennines Archaeology.
- Pettifer, Adrian (2002). English Castles: A Guide by Counties. Woodbridge, UK: Boydell Press. ISBN 9780851157825.
