= Listed buildings in Kirkby Thore =

Kirkby Thore is a civil parish in Westmorland and Furness, Cumbria, England. It contains 14 listed buildings that are recorded in the National Heritage List for England. Of these, two are listed at Grade II*, the middle of the three grades, and the others are at Grade II, the lowest grade. The parish contains the village of Kirkby Thore and the surrounding countryside. Most of the listed buildings are in the village, and consist of houses and associated structures, farmhouses, farm buildings, a church, a house that originated as a medieval hall, a community hall, an animal pound and an associated structure, and a structure built from Roman material. The listed buildings outside the village are a farm and associated farm buildings.

== Key ==
| Grade | Criteria |
|---|---|
| II* | Particularly important buildings of more than special interest |
| II | Buildings of national importance and special interest |

== Buildings ==
| Name and location | Photograph | Date | Notes | Grade |
|---|---|---|---|---|
| St Michael's Church; 54.62731°N 2.56216°W | | 12th century | The church was later altered and expanded. It is in stone on a chamfered plinth and has slate roofs; the roof of the chancel has stone coping and moulded eaves. The church consists of a nave, a north aisle, a south porch, a chancel, and a west tower. The three-stage tower dates from the 12th century, it has stepped buttresses, a narrow west door, an embattled parapet, and a gabled bellcote on the east side. | II* |
| Kirkby Thore Hall; 54.62446°N 2.55676°W | | 14th century | A medieval hall and solar wing, with later alterations and additions and use as a farmhouse. It is in stone with roofs of slate and some stone-flagging. The hall has three bays, originally with a single storey, it was divided horizontally in the late 16th century. The wing consists of a solar over a kitchen. The windows are from most periods, the earlier ones being mullioned or mullioned and transomed, some with hood moulds, there is a two-light window in the solar with Decorated tracery, and there are some 19th-century sash windows. | II* |
| Stone Cottage; 54.62527°N 2.55958°W | — | Mid 18th century | A stone house with rusticated quoins and a slate roof with stone copings. It has a symmetrical two-storey five-bay front, a central doorway with a chamfered surround and a dated lintel, and mullioned windows. | II |
| Village pound and former fire-engine house 54.62565°N 2.56129°W | — | Late 18th century (probable) | The village pound has a rectangular stone wall with triangular coping stones, it contains a 20th-century gate, and is about 5 feet (1.5 m) high. Within the pound is a 19th-century building last used as a fire-engine house. This is also in stone, with quoins, and a Welsh slate roof. It is in a single storey, built at right angles to the road, and has a door in the end wall. | II |
| Mount Pleasant farmhouse, cottage and cart shed 54.62597°N 2.55691°W | — | 1788 | The building is in stone with slate roofs. The house has a roof with stone copings, and a symmetrical two-storey three-bay front. The central doorway has a chamfered surround, above it is an initialled and dated panel, and the windows are mullioned. The cottage extension was added at the west end in the late 19th century. It has quoins, two storeys, two bays, and sash windows. There is an early 19th-century wagon shed at the east end. | II |
| Spitals farmhouse, stables, byre, and gin-gang 54.63048°N 2.58736°W | — | Late 18th to early 19th century | The farmhouse was extended to the east later in the 19th century. The house and outbuildings are in stone with a hipped Welsh slate roof. The front of the farmhouse is stuccoed, there are two storeys, the original part is symmetrical with three bays, and has a central door. The windows in both parts are sashes. At the rear is a stable, and to the east is a single-storey byre, with a semicircular projection from a gin-gang. | II |
| Oak Tree House; 54.62295°N 2.56506°W | — | 1803 | A sandstone house with bands, rusticated quoins and a slate roof with stone copings. There are two storeys and a symmetrical three-bay front. The central doorway has a fanlight, a frieze and a pediment. The windows are sashes in stone surrounds, and there is a round-headed stair window at the rear. | II |
| Gate posts, walls and railings, Oak Tree House; 54.62288°N 2.56494°W | — | Early 19th century | In front of the garden is a low stone wall with chamfered coping. The railings are in cast iron and have standards with turned heads. The gate posts are monoliths with chamfered edges and curved tops, and the cast iron gate has fleurs-de-lis decoration. | II |
| Coach house, barns, byres and entrance arch, Spitals farm 54.63065°N 2.58710°W | — | Early 19th century | The farm buildings are in two ranges at right angles forming two sides of a courtyard. They are in stone with quoins, and have a hipped Welsh slate roof. There is a large segmental arch at the entrance. The west range was the coach house; it has two storeys, four bays, a pair of wagon doors with segmental heads, two doors and four windows above. The north range has five doors and four windows in the ground floor, and four openings with semicircular heads above. | II |
| Threshing barn, Spitals farm 54.63043°N 2.58692°W | — | Early 19th century | The barn forms the east side of the courtyard. It is in stone with quoins, and has a hipped slate roof. The barn has a large wagon entrance with a segmental head, and a smaller door with a shaped head. | II |
| Thornycroft; 54.62570°N 2.56091°W | — | Early 19th century | A stone house with rusticated quoins and a slate roof. It has a symmetrical front with two storeys and three bays. There is a central doorway and sash windows, all with stone surrounds. | II |
| Cottage-granary; 54.62595°N 2.55720°W | — | 1829 | The building is in stone with quoins and it has a slate roof with stone-flagged eaves. There are two storeys and a symmetrical front of three bays. The central doorway has a segmental head and a dated keystone and the widows are casements. | II |
| Foresters' Hall; 54.62556°N 2.56117°W | | 1832 | Originally a single-storey reading room, an upper storey was added in 1844 as a hall for the Foresters. The building is in stone with corner pilasters and a slate roof. There are two storeys and three bays, a plank door on the left, and sash windows. Also on the front are two panels, both dated and with Latin inscriptions. In the ground floor the panel is rectangular, and in the upper floor it is oval with a sculpted deer's head above. | II |
| Roman arches 54.62354°N 2.56233°W | — | Early 20th century | Two arched sandstone recesses in a wall constructed from re-used Roman material. | II |
