= Maiden Way =

Roman road in the north of England

Coordinates: 54°37′30.03″N 2°33′39.12″W

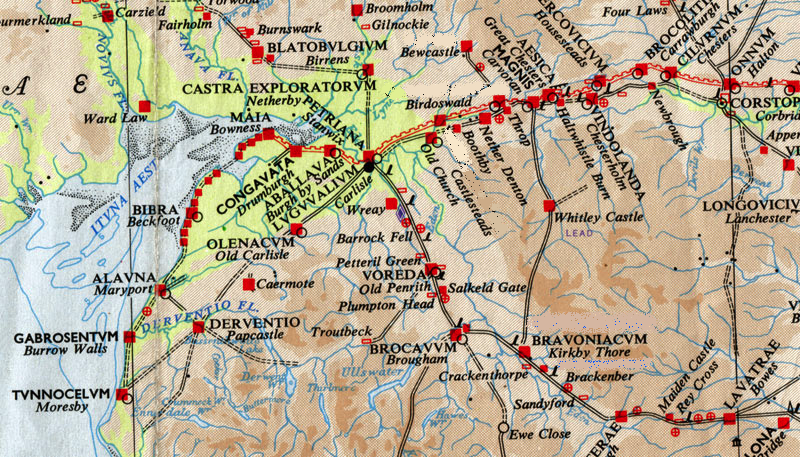
Roman Roads and settlements

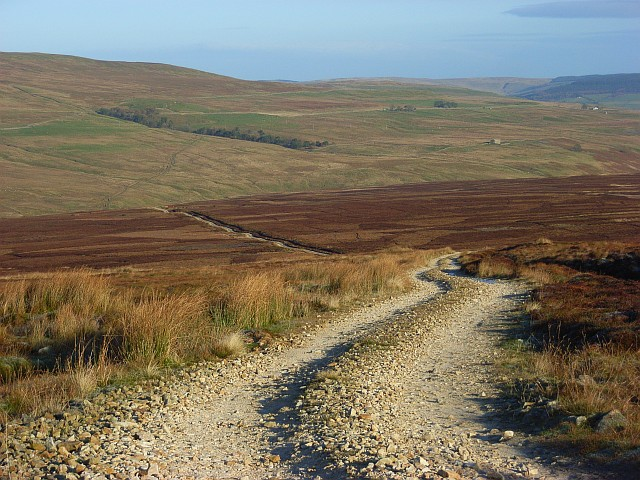
The Maiden Way, where the track heads southeast to Smittergill Head

The Maiden Way or Maidenway (Middle English: Maydengathe; Medieval Latin: Via Puellarum) was a roughly 20-mile (32 km) Roman road in northern Britain connecting the Roman fort of Bravoniacum (Kirkby Thore) near Penrith with that of Magnis (Carvoran) on Hadrian's Wall, via the intermediate fort of Epiacum (also known as Whitley Castle) roughly half-way between the two.

William Bainbridge wrote an early paper on the road, in Archaeologia Aeliana; Account of the Roman Road, called the Maiden Way (1851).

In 2016, it was reported that investigations using LIDAR technology by the Environment Agency for the purposes of flood mapping and other environmental management were providing extensive data showing the existence of underground archaeological features including Roman roads. This included a continuation of the Maiden Way southwards from Kirkby Thore to the Roman fort at Low Borrowbridge near Tebay.

Bravoniacum was a waypoint on the northern leg of the Roman road connecting Luguvalium (Carlisle) with Eboracum (York) and points south. Magnis was one of the waypoints on the Stanegate beside Hadrian's Wall. As such, the Maiden Way served as a shortcut for supplying the central and eastern areas of the Wall. It also provided supplies to the lead and silver mines near Epiacum (Whitley Castle).

The Maiden Way was sometimes considered also to have run east along the Stanegate to Banna (Birdoswald), then 7 miles (11 km) north to Bewcastle Roman Fort, and thence to Liddesdale, but the zig-zag identity of this course as a single road is problematic.

Following the end of Roman rule in Britain, the Maiden Way was used as a drovers' road. The route was probably named after the Maiden Castle fortlet guarding the Stainmore Pass to the east of the fort of Verterae (Brough).

The Pennine Way footpath follows the line of the Maiden Way for several miles on a roughly north-south route across Lambley Common in Northumberland, above the west bank of the river South Tyne. Immediately north of this stretch, a modern minor road follows the line of the Maiden Way for several miles to the west of Featherstone Castle.

== See also ==
- Roman roads in Britain
