= Manduessedum =

Archaeological site in Warwickshire, England

- Location within England
- 52°34′01″N 01°31′12″W
- Type: Fortification and settlement
- Periods: Roman Imperial
- Location: Mancetter, Warwickshire, England
- Region: Brittania

History
- Built: 50

Manduessedum or Manduesedum was a Roman fort and later a civilian small town in the Roman Province of Britannia. It was located on and immediately to the east of the site of the modern village of Mancetter, located in the English county of Warwickshire, close to the modern town of Atherstone. The name is of Romano-Celtic origin, and is likely derived from the Gaulish essedum, meaning 'chariot', whilst the first element mandu was common in Gaulish place names, but its meaning is obscure.

The fort was founded in around AD 50 on the Watling Street Roman road, guarding the point where the road crossed the River Anker. The final battle of the rebel queen of the Britons Boudica at the Battle of Watling Street in AD 60/61 may have taken place near Manduessedum. The British forces were defeated by the Roman general Suetonius Paullinus. The fort appears to have been fairly short lived, as there is little sign of military occupation at the site after AD 70.

Manduessedum later developed into an important civilian settlement, and was the centre of an extensive pottery making industry which primarily produced Mortaria (mixing bowls). The remains of up to 70 pottery kilns dating from the Roman period have been found in the area, as well as the remains of a Roman villa. The area has been listed as a scheduled monument.

Watling Street north of St Albans. The map shows the Roman towns established along Watling Street by the end of the first century AD.
