= Magnis (Carvoran) =

Roman fort in Northumberland, England

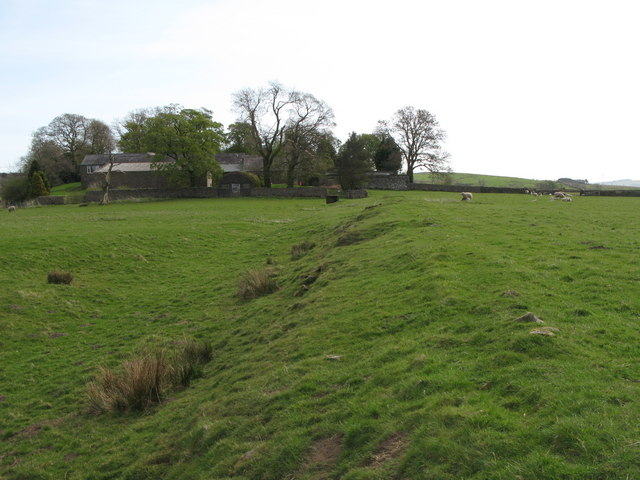
- Carvoran (Magna) Roman Fort - north boundary; and Corvoran Roman Army Museum

- Location within Northumberland
- 54.9849°N 2.5244°W
- Location: Carvoran, Northumberland, England

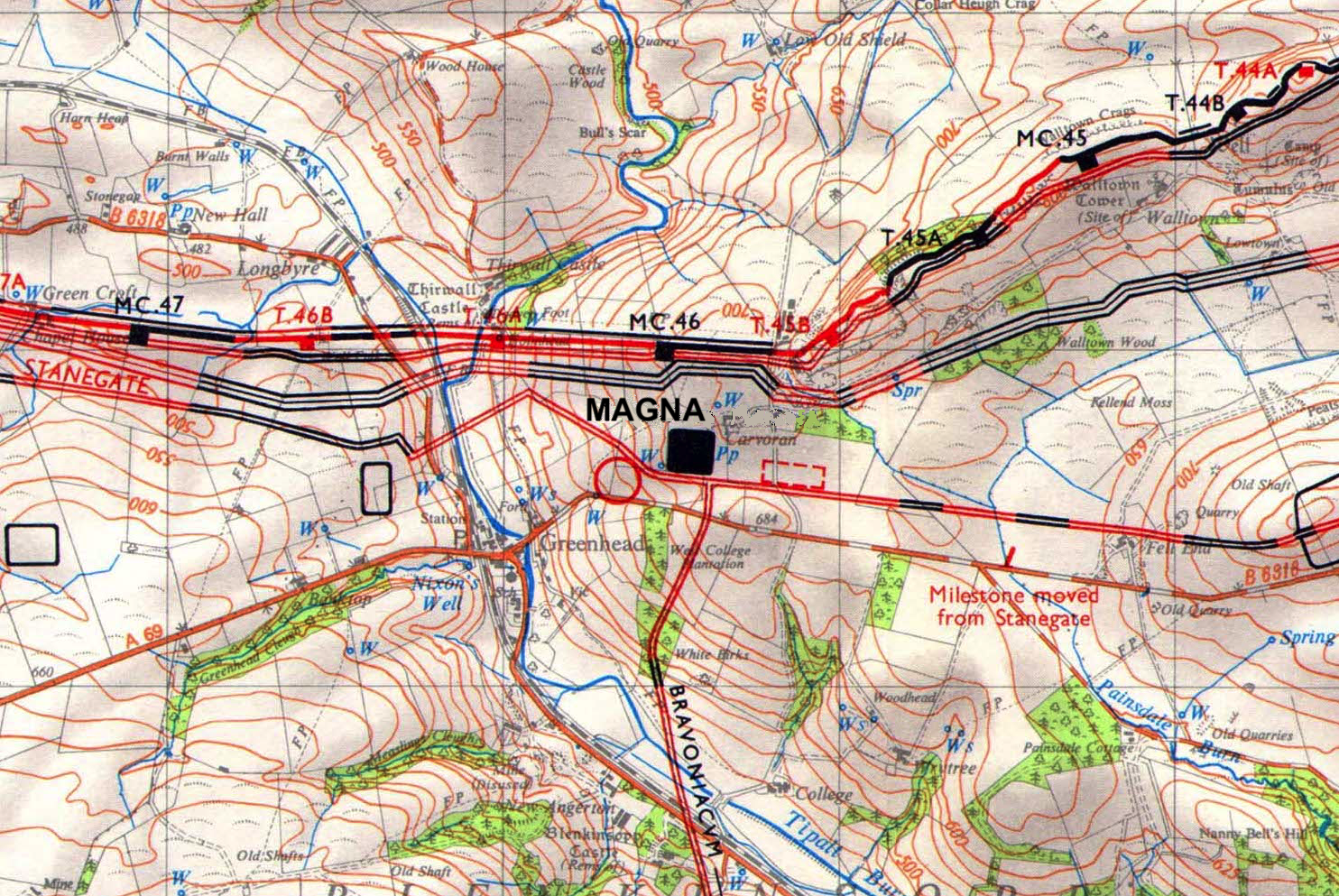
Magna plan from OS 1964 Map

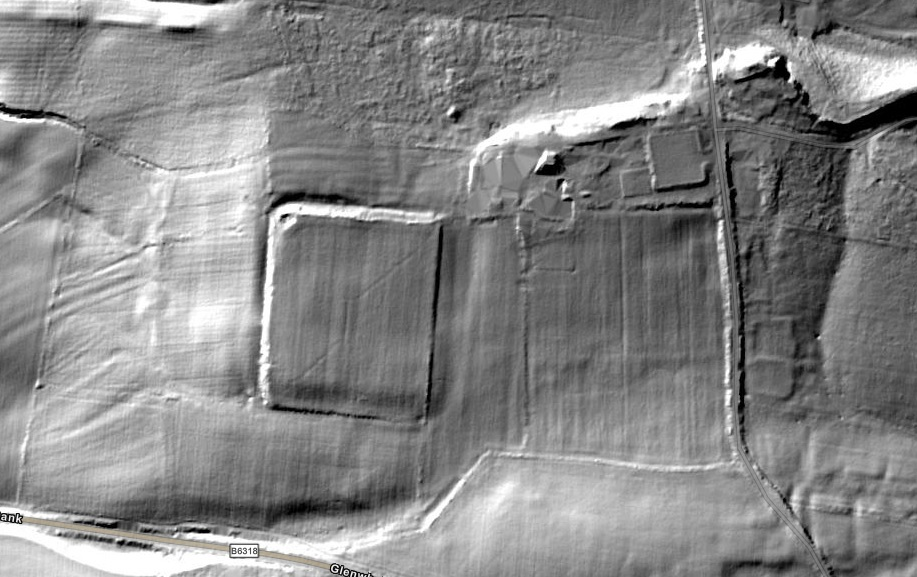
Magna lidar scan

Magnis or Magna was a Roman fort near Hadrian's Wall in northern Britain. Its ruins are now known as Carvoran Roman Fort and are located near Carvoran, Northumberland, in northern England. It was built on the Stanegate frontier and Roman road, linking Coria (Corbridge) in the east to Luguvalium (Carlisle) in the west, before the building of Hadrian's Wall.

The fort is now the site of the Roman Army Museum.

== Name ==
The fort at Carvoran is generally identified with the 'Magnis' which appears both in the Ravenna Cosmography and the Notitia Dignitatum. Further evidence for the name comes from a fragmentary inscription (RIB 1825) apparently seen by the antiquary William Hutchinson in 1766 but which is now lost, which referred to "numerus Magne<c>e(n)s(ium)" ("of the unit of Magn[...] ...."). The name could be a Latin nominative form Magni, or Magna, and the fort is today sometimes referred to under the name "Magna". The name is rather inappropriate for a relatively small fort, and one suggestion is that it could ultimately derive from the Celtic word maen meaning "stone" or "rock".

== Roman fort ==
The site was occupied by several earlier timber-built camps as revealed by aerial photography, and a large enclosure of just under 8 acres (c. 3.2ha) below the later walls. The earliest dateable evidence is from the end of Domitian's reign (1st century).

Magnis was built on the Stanegate frontier in about 80 AD to guard the junction of the Maiden Way Roman road (running north to south) with the Stanegate (running west to east). As such the fort predates Hadrian's Wall.

The Maiden Way ran south from Magnis to Bravoniacum (Kirkby Thore near Penrith). An intermediate fort halfway between the two on the Maiden Way was Whitley Castle or Epiacum, just north of Alston, Cumbria.

Five hundred Hamian archers, known as Cohors Prima Hamiorum Sagittaria, the only regiment of archers known in Britain, were stationed at Magnis starting from 120 AD.

Hadrian's Wall was built from 122 only a few hundred yards north of the fort, and its Vallum ditch was dug to the north of the fort, separating it from the Wall and the frontier zone. The vallum was also diverted much further north of the fort than needed with no apparent reason. The fort was rebuilt in stone in 136-7 when the Antonine Wall was built in what is now Scotland. Further rebuilding was done at the end of the reign of Antoninus Pius (c. 161) and after the withdrawal from the Antonine wall, the same garrison that had occupied it in Hadrianic fort returned.

== Vicus ==
A large vicus (civilian settlement) was located on at least three sides of the fort as revealed by geophysical survey. It was identified by visitors to the remains including Horsley in 1732 and is also testified by many dedications to the god Vitiris.

== Archaeology ==
Artifacts recovered at Magnis include a 2-foot-long (0.61 m) iron spearhead, found at a depth of 36 feet (11 m) in a well, and the well-known modius, a bronze grain-measure.

The site is under the care of the Vindolanda Trust and has the same preservation layers of organic remains. Supported by a grant from the Heritage Lottery Fund, a five-year excavation began in 2023.

In February 2026, a 3rd-century AD terracotta head was discovered by the Vindolanda Trust. The artifact, measuring 78mm by 67mm, depicts a female figure with a centrally parted, braided hairstyle. Found in the fill of a defensive ditch, the piece is characterized by asymmetrical features and a crude execution, leading experts like Roman artifact specialist Lindsay Allason-Jones to suggest it was a "practice piece" produced locally by an unskilled hand. The head will be placed on public display at the Roman Army Museum, while researchers continue to investigate whether the figure represents a specific goddess or a member of the imperial family.

== Roman Army Museum ==
Magnis is the location of the Roman Army Museum run by the Vindolanda Trust. Like the museum at Vindolanda, the Roman Army Museum was modernised and reopened in 2011. The museum illustrates frontier life on the northern edge of the Roman Empire. The museum displays genuine Roman artifacts including weapons and tools; life-size replicas; a 3D film showing Hadrian's Wall past and present, and a large timeline of Hadrian's Wall. There is a gallery devoted to the emperor Hadrian himself. A large gallery describes daily life in the Roman army as seen through the eyes of a team of eight auxiliary soldiers, complete with a film showing their activities. Notable exhibits include a rare surviving helmet crest.
