= Kirkby Thore =

Village and civil parish in Cumbria, England

Coordinates: 54.625483°N 2.558426°W

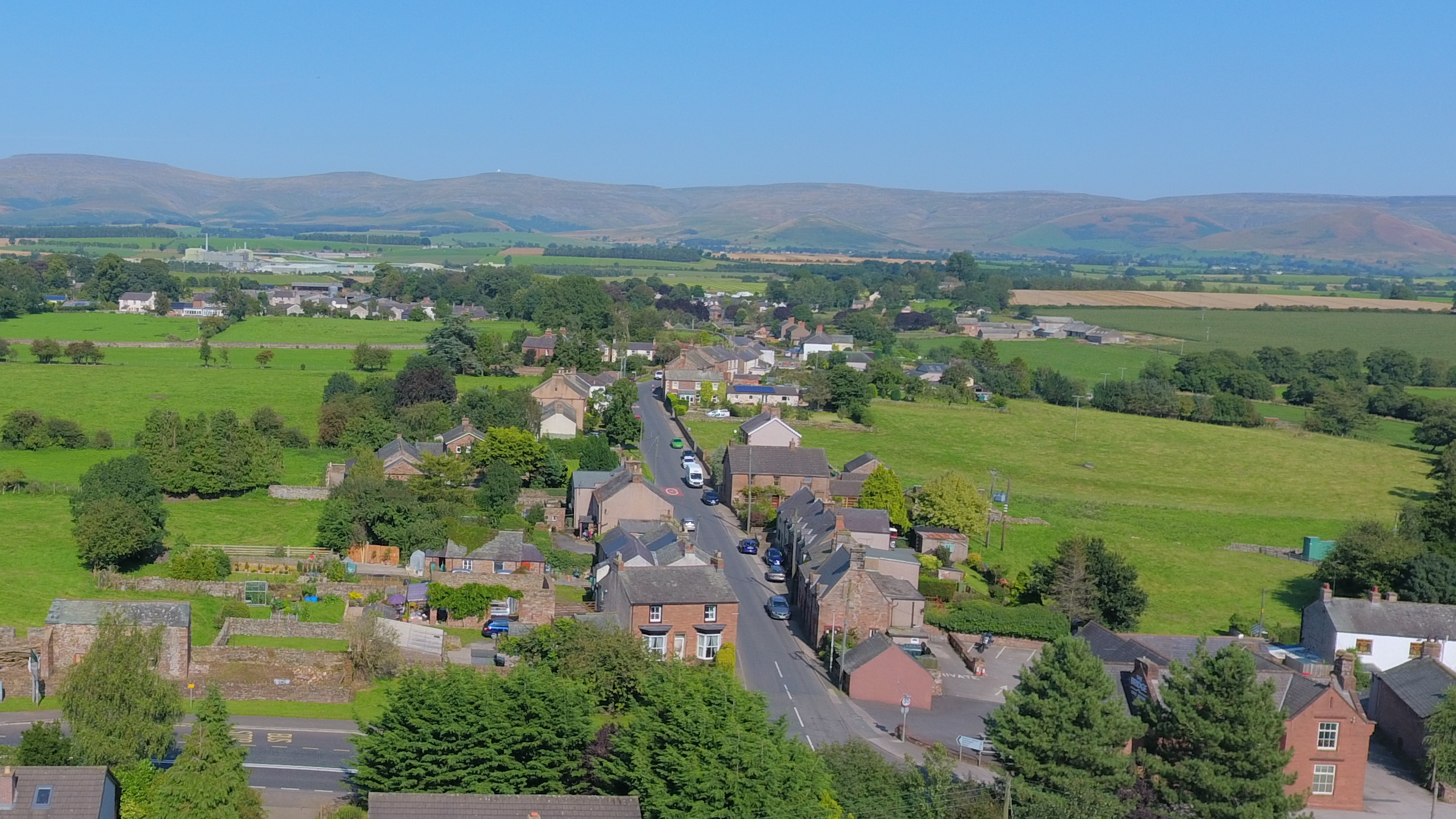
- Kirkby Thore from the A66

- Location in former Eden, Cumbria Location within Cumbria
- Population: 758 (2011)
- OS grid reference: NY639257
- Civil parish: Kirkby Thore
- Unitary authority: Westmorland and Furness
- Ceremonial county: Cumbria
- Region: North West
- Country: England
- Sovereign state: United Kingdom
- Post town: PENRITH
- Postcode district: CA10
- Dialling code: 017683
- Police: Cumbria
- Fire: Cumbria
- Ambulance: North West
- UK Parliament: Westmorland and Lonsdale

Kirkby Thore is a small village and civil parish in Cumbria, England (grid reference NY639257), in the historic county of Westmorland. It is close to the Lake District national park and the Cumbrian Pennines. It includes the areas of Bridge End, in the southwest by the A66, and Cross End in the northeast of the village. In the 2001 census, the parish had a population of 731, increasing to 758 in the 2011 Census. The market town of Appleby-in-Westmorland is about five miles (eight kilometres) away, and the larger town of Penrith is about eight miles (thirteen kilometres) away.

== History ==
The place-name 'Kirkby Thore' is first attested in 1179 in the 'Register of Holm Cultram', where it appears as Kirkebythore. Kirkby means 'church village' or 'village with a church', whilst Thore is an Old Norse personal name related to the god Thor.

The village is on the site of a Roman cavalry camp called Bravoniacum or Brovonacae and Roman coins, tombstones, sandals, urns, earthen vessels, and the cusp of a spear have been found in the locality. Since the time of Septimius Severus's campaigns between 208 and 211 CE, a division of Numidian auxiliary light cavalry garrisoned the fort of Bravoniacum, constituting the first African community in Britain. The Maiden Way Roman road led north from Bravoniacum to the fort of Epiacum (Whitley Castle) near Alston, and thence to Magnae (Carvoran) on Hadrian's Wall, where it joined the Stanegate road running from west to east. A possible continuation from there ran east to Banna (Birdoswald) and then seven miles (eleven kilometres) north to the Shrine of Cocidius (Bewcastle). It was reported in 2016 that LIDAR technology has revealed another Roman road running southwest from Kirkby Thore to the Roman fort at Low Borrowbridge near Tebay.

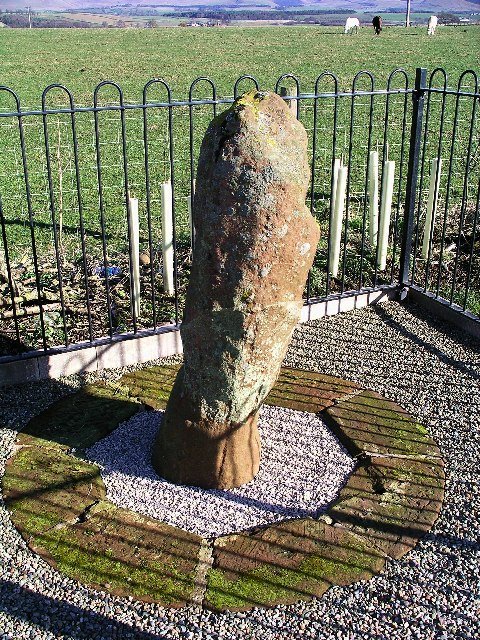
Roman milestone still in situ by the A66 near Kirkby Thore

The Anglican church of St Michael in Kirkby Thore is built of red sandstone and dates from Norman times. The village also had a Methodist chapel.

The village is also home to Kirkby Thore Hall, a Grade II* medieval Manor House of particular structural interest.

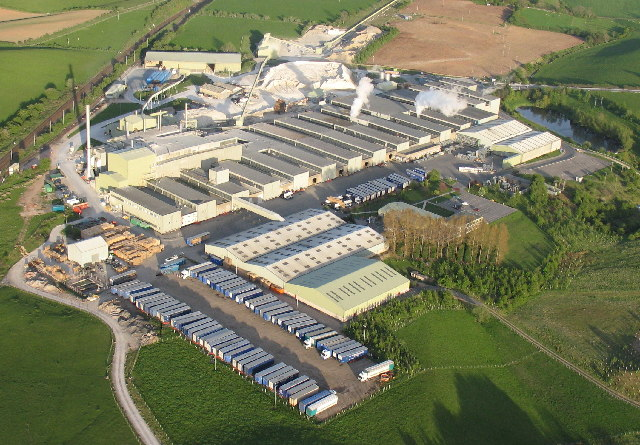
British Gypsum, Kirkby Thore

Gypsum has been quarried or mined in the area for over 200 years. The local British Gypsum Ltd plant has produced plaster since 1910 and plasterboard since the 1960s. Currently it is more economic to use desulpho-gypsum transported by rail from Drax Power Station than to mine it locally but this depends on Drax continuing. British Gypsum has a private siding on the Settle-Carlisle Railway which passes to the north of the village.

There are a number of farms in the village and surrounding area. Some are large dairy farms, others beef and/or sheep with some arable crops.

== Governance ==
Kirkby Thore is in the parliamentary constituency of Westmorland and Lonsdale.

== Transport and facilities ==
The busy A66 road runs through the western edge of the village. This will be one of the last sections of the A66 to be upgraded to dual carriageway; in 2006 the Highways Agency conducted public consultation on the route for a bypass (which will connect the existing Appleby bypass to the east and the Temple Sowerby bypass (opened in part October 2007, ahead of schedule) to the west. The public consultation fell by the wayside and dualling of the A66 at Kirkby Thore is still an aspiration. A subsequent scheme began its proposal stages in 2019.

The village contains a village shop with post office, and a filling station (and shop).

== Notable people ==
Siblings Helen Skelton and Gavin Skelton grew up in a farm near the village and attended Kirkby Thore Primary School before transferring to Appleby Grammar School. Helen is now a television presenter, best known for working on Blue Peter and Countryfile, whilst Gavin is a professional footballer who has played in the Scottish Premier League with Gretna, Kilmarnock and Hamilton Academicals. During 2016 he was player-manager of Queen of the South in Dumfries. He was appointed assistant manager of Carlisle United in June 2019.

== See also ==
- Listed buildings in Kirkby Thore
- Kirkby Thore railway station
