= List of places in Berkshire =

This is a list of places in the ceremonial county of Berkshire, England. It does not include places which were formerly in Berkshire. For places which were formerly in Berkshire, see list of places transferred from Berkshire to Oxfordshire in 1974, and for places which were transferred from Berkshire in 1844 and 1889, see list of Berkshire boundary changes.

== Local authorities ==
The unitary authorities of Berkshire

There are six unitary authorities in Berkshire, which were formed following the dissolution of Berkshire County Council on 31 March 1998.

Local authority	Population	Towns
Bracknell Forest	109,617	Bracknell, Crowthorne, Sandhurst
Reading	155,700	Reading
Slough	140,200	Slough
West Berkshire	104,483	Newbury, Thatcham, Hungerford, Calcot
Windsor and Maidenhead	133,626	Windsor, Maidenhead, Ascot, Eton
Wokingham	126,229	Wokingham, Woodley, Earley, Winnersh

== Towns ==
There are no cities in the county with instead a relatively dense proportion of towns: Reading and Slough are the largest. Both large towns are home to universities and each has three railway stations.

- Ascot
- Bracknell
- Crowthorne
- Earley
- Eton
- Hungerford
- Maidenhead
- Newbury
- Reading
- Sandhurst
- Slough
- Thatcham
- Windsor
- Wokingham
- Woodley

== Civil parishes ==
The following list of civil parishes is compiled from List of civil parishes in Berkshire. Slough and Reading (as an authority) is unparished.

=== Bracknell Forest ===
- Binfield
- Warfield
- Winkfield

=== West Berkshire ===
- Aldermaston
- Aldworth
- Ashampstead
- Basildon
- Beech Hill
- Beedon
- Beenham
- Boxford
- Bradfield
- Brightwalton
- Brimpton
- Bucklebury
- Burghfield
- Catmore
- Chaddleworth
- Chieveley
- Cold Ash
- Combe
- Compton
- East Garston
- East Ilsley
- Enborne
- Englefield
- Farnborough
- Fawley
- Frilsham
- Great Shefford
- Greenham
- Hampstead Norreys
- Hamstead Marshall
- Hermitage
- Holybrook
- Hungerford
- Inkpen
- Kintbury
- Lambourn
- Leckhampstead
- Midgham
- Newbury
- Padworth
- Pangbourne
- Peasemore
- Purley on Thames
- Shaw-cum-Donnington
- Speen
- Stanford Dingley
- Stratfield Mortimer
- Streatley
- Sulham
- Sulhamstead
- Thatcham
- Theale
- Tidmarsh
- Tilehurst
- Ufton Nervet
- Wasing
- Welford
- West Ilsley
- West Woodhay
- Winterbourne
- Wokefield
- Woolhampton
- Yattendon

=== Windsor and Maidenhead ===
- Bisham
- Bray
- Cookham
- Cox Green
- Datchet
- Horton
- Hurley
- Old Windsor
- Shottesbrooke
- Sunningdale
- Sunninghill and Ascot
- Waltham St. Lawrence
- White Waltham
- Wraysbury

=== Wokingham ===
- Arborfield and Newland
- Barkham
- Charvil
- Earley
- Finchampstead
- Remenham
- Ruscombe
- Shinfield
- Sonning
- St. Nicholas, Hurst
- Swallowfield
- Twyford
- Wargrave
- Winnersh
- Wokingham Without
- Wokingham
- Woodley

== Other settlements ==
The following is a list of settlements that cannot be categorized as towns or parishes; as such the majority are suburbs, small villages, or hamlets.

=== Bracknell Forest ===
- Billingbear
- Birch Hill
- Brock Hill
- Brookside
- Bullbrook
- Burleigh
- Chavey Down
- College Town
- Cranbourne
- Crown Wood
- Easthampstead
- Farley Wood
- Hanworth
- Harmans Water
- Hawthorn Hill
- Hayley Green
- Home Farm
- Jealott's Hill
- Lawrence Hill
- Little Sandhurst
- Maiden's Green
- Martins Heron
- Moss End
- Newell Green
- North Ascot
- Nuptown
- Owlsmoor
- Popeswood
- Priestwood
- Quelm Park
- Swinley Forest
- Temple Park
- Warfield Park
- The Warren
- Whitegrove
- Wick Hill
- Wildridings
- Winkfield Row
- Wooden Hill
- Woodside

=== Reading ===
- Caversham
- Caversham Heights
- Caversham Park
- Coley
- Coley Park
- Emmer Green
- Katesgrove
- Southcote
- Whitley
- Whitley Wood
- Tilehurst

=== Slough ===
- Britwell
- Chalvey
- Cippenham
- Colnbrook
- Ditton
- Haymil
- Langley
- Manor Park
- Poyle
- Upton and Upton Lea
- Wexham

=== West Berkshire ===
- Aldermaston Wharf
- Bagnor
- Beansheaf Farm
- Beedon Common
- Benham Hill
- Bloomfield Hatch
- Brightwalton Green
- Brimpton Common
- Burghfield Bridge
- Burghfield Common
- Burghfield Hill
- Burnt Hill
- Calcot
- Chapel Row
- Colthrop
- Crockham Heath
- Crookham Common
- Crookham
- Curridge
- Denford Park
- Donnington
- Downend
- East Shefford
- Eastbury
- Eddington
- Elcot
- Eling
- Enborne Row
- Fords Farm
- Grazeley
- Grazeley Green
- Goddard's Green
- Halfway
- Heads Hill
- Hell Corner
- Hoe Benham
- Honey Bottom
- Horncastle
- Hungerford Newtown
- Hunts Green
- Hyde End
- Inkpen Common
- Lambourn Woodlands
- Leckhampstead Thicket
- Leverton
- Little Heath
- Lower Basildon
- Lower Denford
- Lower Padworth
- Marlston
- Marsh Benham
- Midgham Green
- Mortimer Common
- Mortimer
- Oare
- Ownham
- Padworth Common
- Pingewood
- Shaw
- Sheffield Bottom
- Shefford Woodlands
- Snelsmore
- South Fawley
- Southend
- Speenhamland
- Stanmore
- Stockcross
- Sulhamstead Abbots
- Tidmarsh
- Tutts Clump
- Upper Basildon
- Upper Bucklebury
- Upper Denford
- Upper Eddington
- Upper Lambourn
- Upper Woolhampton
- Wash Common
- Wash Water
- Weston
- Wickham
- Wickham Heath
- Woodlands St Mary
- Woodspeen
- World's End

=== Windsor and Maidenhead ===
- Boyn Hill
- Braywick
- Burchetts Green
- Cheapside
- Clewer
- Cookham Dean
- Dedworth
- Eton Wick
- Fifield
- Holyport
- Knowl Hill
- Littlewick Green
- Oakley Green
- Paley Street
- Pinkneys Green
- Shurlock Row
- South Ascot
- Stubbings
- Sunninghill
- Touchen End
- Warren Row
- Water Oakley

=== Wokingham ===
- Arborfield
- Arborfield Cross
- Arborfield Garrison
- California
- Cockpole Green
- Crazies Hill
- Emmbrook
- Farley Hill
- Gardeners Green
- Hare Hatch
- Holme Green
- Kiln Green
- Ravenswood
- Riseley
- Ryeish Green
- Sindlesham
- Spencers Wood
- Three Mile Cross
- Upper Culham
- Whistley Green
- Woosehill

== See also ==
- List of settlements in Berkshire by population
- List of places in England
