= Jennett's Park =

Area of Bracknell, Berkshire, England

Coordinates: 51.408069°N 0.730441°W

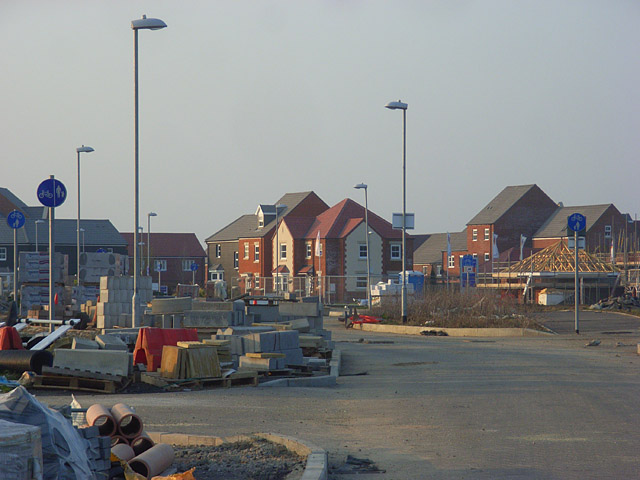
- Jennett's Park under construction

- Location within Berkshire
- OS grid reference: SU848683
- Metropolitan borough: Bracknell Forest
- Metropolitan county: Berkshire
- Region: South East
- Country: England
- Sovereign state: United Kingdom
- Post town: BRACKNELL
- Postcode district: RG12
- Dialling code: 01344
- Police: Thames Valley
- Fire: Royal Berkshire
- Ambulance: South Central
- UK Parliament: Bracknell Maidenhead (minor)

Jennett's Park is a suburb of Bracknell in the English county of Berkshire. It is a recent development with the first residents moving there in 2007. It is in the Binfield South & Jennett's Park ward of Bracknell Forest Council.

The development lies approximately 1.5 miles (2.4 km) south west of the town centre, to the south of the A329 road close to its junction with the A329(M) and near Great Hollands and Amen Corner. A new roundabout was built on the A329 for access.

At the heart of the development, in Tawny Owl Square, is Jennett's Park Church of England Primary School as well as a Community Centre . Both were officially opened in October 2011. The Community Centre is owned by the local authority (Bracknell Forest) but is leased to and managed by Jennett's Park Community Association. The centre has one of the largest halls in the local area. The former Peacock Farm on Peacock Lane has been redeveloped into a public house and restaurant, The Peacock Farm. All the streets in the estate are named after birds to reflect this heritage.

In October 2014 local councillor Michael Gbadebo announced that contracts had been exchanged between Redrow Homes and BBS Kirkby for the retail unit at Jennett's Park and, in time, they would have an agreement with Morrisons to operate the store once it had been built.

Building work on the retail unit started at the end of January 2016. After extended delays two units were leased by the Co-operative Group – the convenience store opened on 7 December 2018 whilst the remaining unit was sublet by Co-op to Sears Property, a family-owned and run estate agency with branches in Bracknell and Jennett's Park, in mid 2019.

The main Jennett's Park development has two small plots that remain undeveloped at the moment – planning permission has been granted for flats, houses and a retail unit to be built next to the Co-op store whilst planning permission for a private children's nursery on the grassed area next to the Community Centre was refused in 2019 after a number of objections by residents.

St Francis and St Clare was the local family church and held weekly services in the school's hall – unfortunately the church closed on 19 May 2024. The main parish church is St Michael and St Mary Magdelene situated on Crowthorne Road, Easthampstead.

Jennett's Park Church of England School is an aided Church of England school in the Diocese of Oxford. On 1 June 2017 the school became an academy under the Bonitas Trust Multi-Academy Trust. The school is a full 2 year entry from Reception through to Year 6. The current head is Elizabeth Savage. The school has an active PTA hosting many events and raising much needed funds each year.
