= John Nike =

English businessman

John Nike OBE DL
- Born: Leonard John Nike; 5 July 1935; Devon, United Kingdom
- Died: 25 December 2016 (aged 81); Reading, Berkshire, England
- Occupation: Businessman
- Known for: Nike Land Securities Ltd chairman, leisure and hotel entrepreneur

Leonard John Nike OBE DL (5 July 1935 – 25 December 2016) was a British businessman, who was a Bracknell-based leisure and hotel entrepreneur. He was best known for being the owner of the eponymous John Nike Leisuresport chain of dry ski slope complexes.

Nike was the Chairman of Nike Land Securities Ltd (trading as the Nike Group of Companies), a Bracknell-based company encompassing a wide range of activities, with commercial interests spanning property, construction, a hotel, restaurants, skiing and ice skating. Nike was also a Deputy Lieutenant of Berkshire, as well as being an Honorary Freeman of the Borough of Bracknell Forest. He was a benefactor to many institutions, especially in academia, education and sports.

With his family, he was worth £92 million according to the Sunday Times Rich List 2006.

== Life and career ==
Nike originally came from Devon. He moved to Bracknell in 1964 and worked for a garden centre until 1967. Following redundancy, Nike decided to find some land to build his own garden centre. He acquired 60 acres (24 ha) of land (formerly Binfield Brickworks) in the Amen Corner area of the town in 1969 through his company Key Properties Ltd. Planning permission was eventually obtained in 1979 to build a leisuresport complex, hotel, garden centre and business park. John Nike Leisuresport Bracknell (home of the Bracknell Bees ice hockey team) opened in 1985 for dry slope skiing and in 1987 for ice skating. The adjacent four star, 205-bedroom Coppid Beech Hotel, which has an alpine ski lodge design, opened in 1993 and is operated by his company Nike Group Hotels Ltd.

Nike expanded his John Nike Leisuresport Ltd business, and came to own dry ski slopes in Bracknell, Chatham, Llandudno, Plymouth and Swadlincote. He had plans to open a further dry ski slope in Wrexham. He also used to operate Bristol Ice Rink until it closed in October 2012. Nike owned Leisuresport World, a retail outlet chain specialising in the winter sports sector, with outlets at all five John Nike Leisuresport Complexes, along with an online shopping operation. In addition, he owns 94% of Techmat 2000 Ltd, which manufactures and owns the patents for the dry ski slope surfaces Skitech and Perma-snow, and the patent for the artificial grass surface Greengrass. Nike also used to own the Thames Valley Tigers basketball team until it folded in 2005.

Nike had various property and construction interests. In addition to his property letting and development company Key Properties Ltd, he owned Treescape Ltd (which specialises in estate management), Nike Construction Ltd (a construction contractor), 89.9% of Nike Design Ltd (who are architects and engineers) and the Bracknell building merchant Jubilee Building Supplies, which also has an online shopping operation. He was also a shareholder in The 33 Group Ltd, which lets out commercial property in Bracknell.

Nike funded The John Nike Athletics Stadium at the Bracknell Sport and Leisure Centre in 1984, The John Nike Lecture Theatre in the Agriculture Building at the University of Reading in 2000, The John Nike Digital Suite at South Hill Park in Bracknell in 2004 and The John Nike Dance Studio at The Brakenhale School in Bracknell in 2011.

== Death ==
He lived in Binfield. Nike died at a hospital in Reading on 25 December 2016.

== Recognition ==
- Nike was appointed as an Officer of the Order of the British Empire (OBE) in the 2002 New Year Honours List for services to business and the community in Bracknell.
- Nike was commissioned as a Deputy Lieutenant of Berkshire in 2005.
- Nike was admitted as an Honorary Freeman of the Borough of Bracknell Forest in 2013.
