= Lawrence Hill, Berkshire =

Area of Bracknell, Berkshire, England

Coordinates: 51.428890°N 0.741146°W

Lawrence Hill
- Location within Berkshire
- OS grid reference: SU876705
- Civil parish: Warfield
- Unitary authority: Bracknell Forest
- Ceremonial county: Berkshire
- Region: South East
- Country: England
- Sovereign state: United Kingdom
- Post town: BRACKNELL
- Postcode district: RG42
- Dialling code: 01344
- Police: Thames Valley
- Fire: Royal Berkshire
- Ambulance: South Central
- UK Parliament: Maidenhead

Lawrence Hill is a northern suburb of Bracknell in the English county of Berkshire. It stands within the civil parish of Warfield.

The settlement lies near to the A3095 road and is approximately 1 mile (1.6 km) north-east of Bracknell.

The suburb was named after the owner of a local brickworks.
