= Berkshire Music Trust =

British music education organization

- The Berkshire Young Musicians Trust
- Formation: 25 October 1982; 44 years ago
- Legal status: Limited company, Registered charity
- Purpose: Extra-curricular music education
- Headquarters: Reading
- Region served: Berkshire
- Members: Private
- Chairman: Jon Carroll
- Chief Executive: Dawn Wren
- Main organ: Board of trustees
- Staff: ~260
- Website: berksmusictrust.org.uk
- Formerly called: Berkshire Maestros

The Berkshire Young Musicians Trust (trading as Berkshire Music Trust) is a music education charity operating in Berkshire, United Kingdom.

== History ==
The Berkshire Young Musicians Trust (BYMT) was founded in 1982. Between 2006 and 2023 it traded as Berkshire Maestros, after which it was rebranded the Berkshire Music Trust.

== Description ==
The charity's aim is to bring music to a wider audience, and encourage children to play a musical instrument, sing, or play music in a group with others.

The charity teaches over 6,000 children in schools, bands, orchestras and choirs, and has centres in Bracknell, Newbury, Windsor, Reading and Wokingham. Tuition covers a wide range of instruments, including vocals, guitar, keyboard, percussion, brass, strings and woodwind in a range of styles, and composition.

Following the renaming ceremony coinciding with 40th birthday celebrations in the summer of 2023, Berkshire Music Trust adopted a new strap-line, "Making Music for Everyone", signalling their intent to expand their offerings to all ages in the Berkshire community, building upon their Parkinson's Sing-along Cafe and Dementia Sing-along Cafe.

== Recognition ==
In 2024, Berkshire Music Trust was awarded new generation Music Hub status by Arts Council England.

== Events ==
In 2007, the charity's choir appeared at the BBC Proms, and alongside Southbank Sinfonia at the Windsor Festival. In 2014, the organisation was awarded a grant from the Andrew Lloyd Webber Foundation. On 1 May 2016, around 1,500 of the Berkshire Maestros students performed a concert at the Royal Albert Hall. Primary school choirs from West Berkshire, Windsor and Maidenhead performed songs from musicals such as Mamma Mia!, Oliver! and The Jungle Book.

On 19 October 2018, the Bracknell concert band played to Elizabeth II at The Lexicon, Bracknell. In 2023, the charity's county choir and string ensemble played at St George's Chapel at Windsor Castle culminating in a performance of Zadok the Priest.

In 2024, Bracknell, Windsor, Newbury and Reading Senior Wind Bands united to form the Berkshire County Massed Wind Bands, to perform Brian Balmages' Rapture at the Anvil Theatre in Basingstoke.
