= Wooden Hill =

Area of Bracknell, Berkshire, England

Coordinates: 51.390°N 0.774°W

- Location within Berkshire
- OS grid reference: SU8566
- Civil parish: Bracknell
- Unitary authority: Bracknell Forest
- Ceremonial county: Berkshire
- Region: South East
- Country: England
- Sovereign state: United Kingdom
- Post town: BRACKNELL
- Postcode district: RG12
- Dialling code: 01344
- Police: Thames Valley
- Fire: Royal Berkshire
- Ambulance: South Central
- UK Parliament: Bracknell

Wooden Hill is a private estate within the council ward of Great Hollands, Bracknell, in Berkshire, England.

The settlement lies west of the A3095 road and is approximately 2 miles (3.2 km) south-west of Bracknell town centre.

The hill holds Wooden Hill Primary School in one of its 7 roads, and also has a portion of Great Hollands Recreation Ground visible nearer to the top of the hill. All roads in Wooden Hill begin with 'S'
