= Moss End =

Hamlet in Berkshire, England

Coordinates: 51.446522°N 0.750995°W

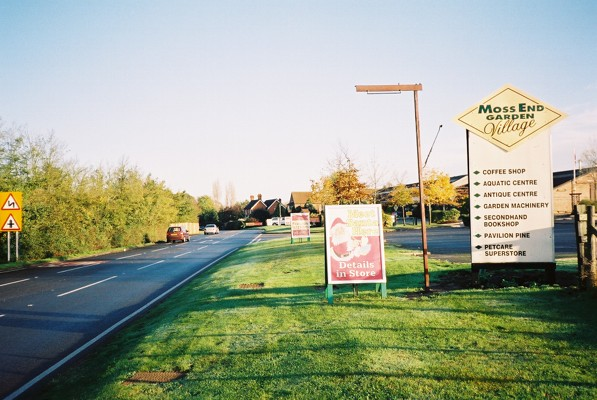

- Location within Berkshire
- OS grid reference: SU868727
- Metropolitan borough: Bracknell Forest
- Metropolitan county: Berkshire
- Region: South East
- Country: England
- Sovereign state: United Kingdom
- Post town: BRACKNELL
- Postcode district: RG42
- Dialling code: 01344
- Police: Thames Valley
- Fire: Royal Berkshire
- Ambulance: South Central
- UK Parliament: Maidenhead

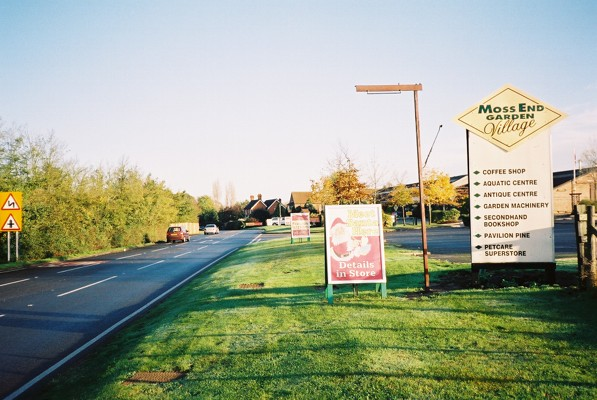
A sign for the Moss End Garden Village

Moss End is a hamlet in Berkshire, England, within the civil parish of Warfield.

The settlement lies on the A3095 road and is approximately 2 miles (3.2 km) north of Bracknell.
