= Home Farm, Bracknell =

Housing estate in Bracknell, Berkshire, England

Coordinates: 51.391004°N 0.782251°W

Home Farm
- Location within the United Kingdom
- OS grid reference: SU846662
- Metropolitan borough: Bracknell Forest
- Metropolitan county: Berkshire
- Country: England
- Sovereign state: United Kingdom
- Post town: BRACKNELL
- Postcode district: RG12
- Dialling code: 01344
- UK Parliament: Bracknell

Home Farm is a housing estate in Bracknell, in Berkshire, England. It consists of 330 dwellings, with a number of two-, three- and four-bedroomed terraced houses, together with several blocks of flats.

The estate lies north of the A3095 road and is approximately 2 miles (3.2 km) south-west of Bracknell town centre. Home Farm was developed on the site of a small farm on the edge of Great Hollands, near to the Downshire golf course and King's Academy Easthampstead Park. By road, the housing estate is accessible via Ringmead (the Great Hollands ring road).

== History ==
Home Farm was built in the mid-1970s by a private developer, but the project stopped when the developer ran out of money. The site was taken over by Bracknell Council, and the houses used for social housing. Following the 'Right to buy' legislation, about 50% of the homes are now in private ownership.

It differs from the rest of Great Hollands in that traffic segregation has not been included in the plan.

A 2013 report by the University of Reading investigating the health impact of building improvements found that residents of Home Farm reported experiencing positive outcomes more frequently than expected, following work performed in 2011–2012.
