= Binfield Place =

Listed country house in Berkshire, England

- Location within Berkshire Location within England
- 51°25′53″N 0°47′33″W
- Type: Country House
- Location: Binfield, Berkshire, England
- OS grid reference: SU 84030 70953

History
- Built: Early 16th century
- Built for: Robert Sampson

Site notes
- Architectural style: Tudor

Listed Building – Grade II*
- Official name: Binfield Place
- Designated: 7 December 1966; 59 years ago
- Reference no.: 1390270

Listed Building – Grade II
- Official name: Walls and gate piers to Binfield Place
- Designated: 20 December 1972; 53 years ago
- Reference no.: 1390271

Binfield Place is an English country house. It is a historic Grade II* listed building. The house is located at the west edge of Binfield, Berkshire.

== History ==
The current building may be the oldest house in the parish. What remains today is part of a larger early 16th-century house, probably built by Robert Sampson, "'Clarke of the Counsell' to Henry VII". Sampson was originally from Kersey, Suffolk.

A 17th-century bas-relief of a lady's head, known as the "Luck of Binfield," hangs in the house. The superstition is that any owner that removes it will be cursed.

As of 2010, the building contained offices.

== Architecture ==
Distinguished by the large 18th-century Gothic window to the right of the entrance, just the hall block and east wing of the original house remain. The building was originally half-timbered but was refaced with brick in the early 18th century. An extension was added to the house in the late 18th century.

The interior contains much 17th-century panelling, along with 16th-century beams and fireplace.

Marking the southern entrance to the property is a Grade II listed 17th-century gateway with brick posts and stone cappings and balls.

== See also ==
- Grade II* listed buildings in Berkshire
