= Coral Reef Waterworld =

Water park in Bracknell, Berkshire, England

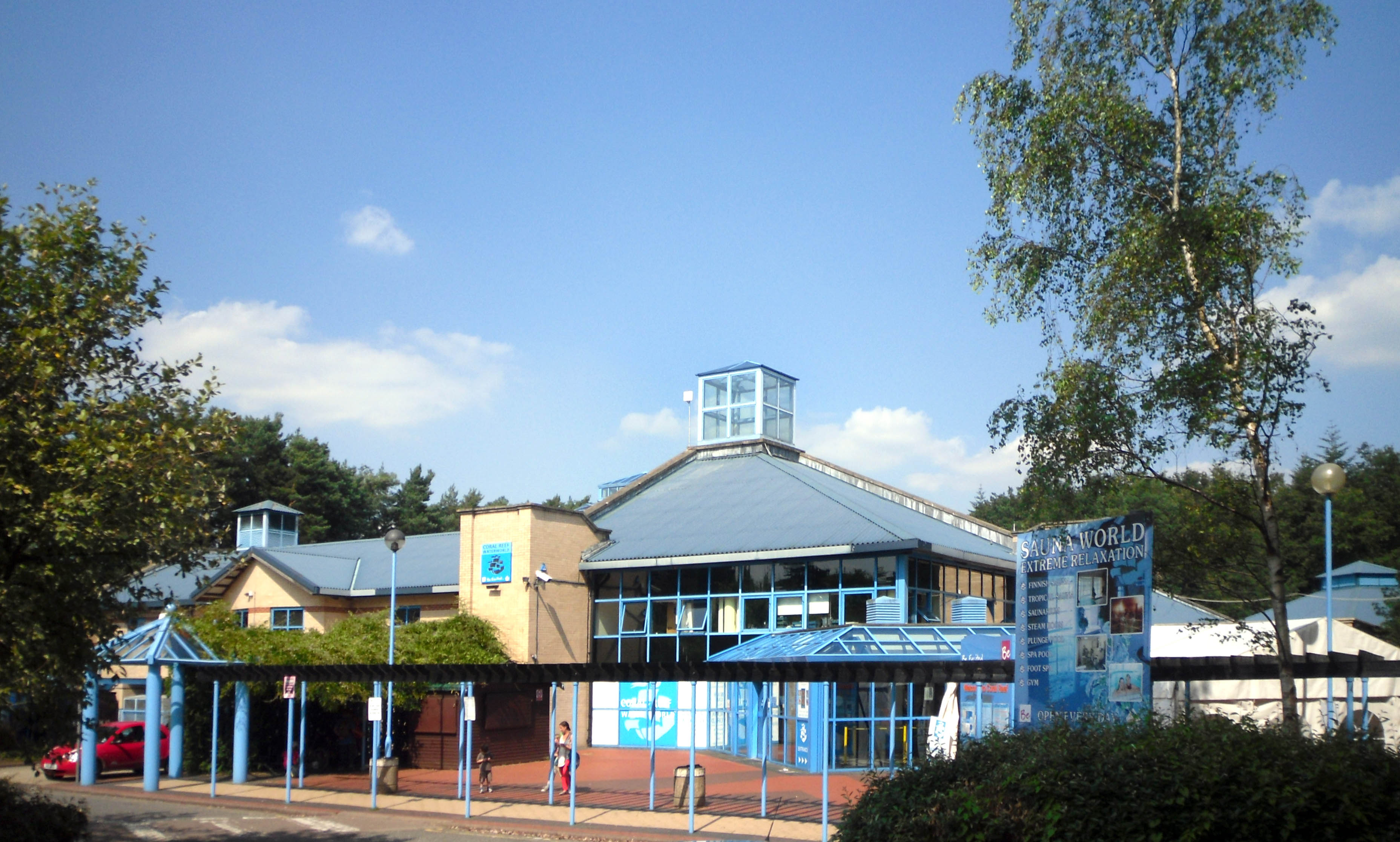
- Coral Reef Waterworld in 2012
- Interactive map of Coral Reef Waterworld
- Location: Bracknell, Berkshire, England
- Coordinates: 51.39000°N 0.73750°W
- Owner: Bracknell Forest Council
- Opened: 1989
- Operating season: Open all year
- Water slides: 5 water slides
- Website: Coral Reef Waterworld

Coral Reef Waterworld is an indoor water park located in Bracknell, Berkshire, England. Owned and operated by Bracknell Forest Council, it is a significant leisure attraction for residents of Berkshire and the wider South East region bringing in 460,000 visitors a year.

== History ==
Coral Reef Waterworld first opened its doors in 1989. Recognizing the need for modernization and expansion, Bracknell Forest Council embarked on a major £13 million refurbishment project. The facility closed for this extensive renovation in 2016 and officially reopened to the public on 29 September 2017. The refurbishment aimed to create a new waterslide tower with five slides and renovate the roof. In March 2018, Everyone Active took over the running of Coral Reef.

== Attractions ==
=== Slides ===
The 2017 revamped Coral Reef Waterworld features a variety of new slides including:

- The Cannon: A high-speed slide with a steep drop.
- Aqua Splash: A more gentle slide suitable for younger children.
- Storm Chaser: An interactive ring waterslide allowing riders to choose their lighting and sound experience.
- Maelstrom: A darker, twisting ring waterslide with an enclosed flume.
- Poseidon's Peril: A toilet bowl ring waterslide.

The pirate ship features a small multi-lane racing waterslide.

=== Other attractions ===
There is a large main pool which ranges from 0.15 to 1.35 metres deep and contains a rapids section, the pirate ship and a volcano which fires out water at select times.

For young kids there is a splash zone

A child restricted section contains "three saunas, a japanese steam room, a spa pool, a cool pool, and heated sun loungers."

=== Former slides and attractions ===
Prior to the renovation the park and three large slides, all named after snakes: The Anaconda, Boa Constrictor and Python.

== Incidents ==
Shortly after reopening, the waterpark was broken into by three YouTubers, one being Ally Law. In the video published they spent the night on the slides after getting past guards, whilst wearing high-vis. The Thames Valley Police subsequently released a statement saying it was a "civil matter" and that the three faced no charges.

== Reception ==
The water park was criticised after the £13 million refurbishment, BBC reported that the main pool was not upgraded. While the changing rooms had been refurbished they were dirty and unkept. Queues were up to 90 minutes, and the pool was "absolute chaos" with claims of verrucas.
