= Farley Wood =

Area of Binfield, Berkshire, England

Coordinates: 51.418769°N 0.779521°W

- Location within Berkshire
- OS grid reference: SU849695
- Metropolitan borough: Bracknell Forest
- Metropolitan county: Berkshire
- Region: South East
- Country: England
- Sovereign state: United Kingdom
- Post town: BRACKNELL
- Postcode district: RG42
- Dialling code: 01344
- Police: Thames Valley
- Fire: Royal Berkshire
- Ambulance: South Central
- UK Parliament: Maidenhead

Farley Wood is a suburb in the civil parish of Binfield, approximately 1.2 miles (1.9 km) west of Bracknell, in the English county of Berkshire. Farley Wood is dominated by Farley Copse (sometimes known as Farley Moor Copse), a large woodland and local nature reserve on the slopes falling away from Farley Hall and Farley Moor, two large Victorian houses.

Following the building in the 1980s of a small housing estate either side of the Turnpike Road, the remaining copse was adopted by Bracknell Forest Borough Council providing a large woodland space full of oak, beech and ash trees; it is also home to a large Wellingtonia pine as well as various Roe Deer. Farley Wood Community Centre is nearby.

To the south of the wood is Farley Moor Lake in the vicinity of which are many of Bracknell's big employers, such as Cable & Wireless, 3M, Fujitsu, HP and Dell in the nearby Amen Corner Business Park.
