= The Offence =

1973 film directed by Sidney Lumet

- Theatrical release poster
- Directed by: Sidney Lumet
- Screenplay by: John Hopkins
- Based on: This Story of Yours (1968 play) by John Hopkins
- Produced by: Denis O'Dell
- Starring: Sean Connery; Trevor Howard; Vivien Merchant; Ian Bannen
- Cinematography: Gerry Fisher
- Edited by: John Victor-Smith
- Music by: Harrison Birtwistle
- Production company: Tantallon
- Distributed by: United Artists
- Release date: 11 January 1973 (UK)
- Running time: 112 minutes
- Country: United Kingdom
- Language: English
- Budget: $900,000

The Offence is a 1973 British neo-noir crime drama film directed by Sidney Lumet starring Sean Connery, Trevor Howard, Vivien Merchant, and Ian Bannen. Connery plays a veteran police detective who suffers a psychological breakdown and kills a suspect during an interrogation. The screenplay was written by John Hopkins, who adapted his 1968 stage play This Story of Yours.

Released by United Artists on January 11, 1973, the film received positive reviews from critics, who praised Connery and Bannen's performances. Bannen was nominated for a BAFTA Award for Best Supporting Actor, for his role.

The Offence was the third of five collaborations between Lumet and Connery, and one of five films Lumet produced in the United Kingdom during the 1960s and '70s.

== Plot ==
Detective Sergeant Johnson has been a police officer for twenty years and is deeply affected by the murders, rapes and other violent crimes he has investigated. He is plagued by images of violence, and he appears to be losing his mind under the strain. His anger surfaces while interrogating Kenneth Baxter, who is suspected of raping a young girl. By the end of the interrogation, Johnson has severely beaten Baxter, who is taken to hospital and later dies.

Johnson is suspended for the beating and returns home for the night, getting into a violent argument with his wife Maureen. Two of Johnson's colleagues come to inform him of Baxter's death and take him to the police station for questioning. The following day, Johnson is interviewed by Detective Superintendent Cartwright. During their long confrontation, flashbacks show the events of the previous night, when Johnson beat Baxter.

The flashbacks portray Baxter – whose guilt or innocence is left ambiguous – taunting Johnson, insinuating that Johnson secretly wants to commit the sort of sex crimes that he investigates. Johnson at first flies into a rage and strikes Baxter, but he eventually admits that he does indeed harbour obsessive fantasies of murder and rape. He then tearfully begs Baxter to help him. When Baxter recoils from him in disgust, Johnson brutally beats him while Baxter continues to taunt and laugh at him.

The film ends with another flashback, this time of Johnson attacking the police officers who pulled him off Baxter, and muttering "God...my God..." as he realises what he has done.

== Cast ==
- Sean Connery as Detective Sergeant Johnson
- Trevor Howard as Detective Superintendent Cartwright
- Vivien Merchant as Maureen Johnson
- Ian Bannen as Kenneth Baxter
- Peter Bowles as Detective Inspector Cameron
- Derek Newark as Detective Sergeant Frank Jessard
- Ronald Radd as Detective Chief Inspector Lawson
- John Hallam as Detective Sergeant Panton
- Richard Moore as Constable Garrett
- Anthony Sagar as Sergeant Hill
- Maxine Gordon as Janie Edmonds
- Howard Goorney as Billy Lambert
- Hilda Fenemore as woman on common
- Cynthia Ludd as child at school
- Rhoda Lewis as woman at school

== Production ==
When Connery agreed to return as James Bond in Diamonds Are Forever, David V. Picker, CEO of United Artists, pledged to back two of Connery's own film projects, provided they cost $2 million or less, in association with Connery's own production company, Tantallon Films. The Offence, made under the working title Something Like the Truth (a line that appears in John Hopkins' original play), was the first. Connery was keen to shake off the image of James Bond and expand his range as an actor.

Connery had previously worked with Hopkins when the writer had co-scripted Thunderball and had seen the play during its original run in London in 1968. Seeing potential in the story, Connery bought the option on the film rights and asked Hopkins to adapt the script for the big screen.

Having made two films with Sidney Lumet, The Hill (1965) and The Anderson Tapes (1971), Connery offered him the job of directing. Lumet accepted. Ian Bannen, who had also appeared in The Hill, was hired as co-star. Howard Goorney plays a small part (Billy Lambert) like he did in The Hill during the opening scene as Trooper Walters.

The film was shot on a small budget of £385,000 in March and April 1972 in and around Bracknell, Berkshire, notably the Wildridings Mill Pond area and Easthampstead's Point Royal. Interior sets were filmed at Twickenham Studios. A collection of location stills and corresponding contemporary photographs is hosted at reelstreets.com.

The fight sequences between Connery and Bannen were choreographed, uncredited, by Bob Simmons, who had designed similar action scenes for the Bond films. The film was Sir Harrison Birtwistle's only film score.

United Artists released The Offence early in 1973. It was a critical success but a commercial failure and did not yield a profit for nine years, even going unreleased in several markets, including France, where it did not premiere until 2007. Due to the commercial failure of the film, United Artists opted out of the two-film financing deal they made with Connery and his production company.

== Reception ==
The Monthly Film Bulletin wrote:

The emphasis is on character – and particularly, of course, that of Johnson, vividly drawn as a man of limited sensibilities, trained to stifle emotion, brutalised by years of police work, and mentally battered into a sado-masochist frenzy ... But there is little resolution beyond Johnson's climactic and inarticulate explosion of violence. ... The dialogue is too dense and sustained at too high a pitch for cinematic comfort and – no matter how much the camera may sniff restlessly around looking for fresh angles – the static, confined settings add to the general oppressiveness. The acting, too, appears out of sorts, although the parts are meaty enough: Sean Connery's hard, reticent style suits Johnson the acerbic copper, but never suggests the brand of high-tension playing called for in the principal scenes; while both Vivien Merchant and Trevor Howard seem curiously subdued in their set-pieces. The exception ... is Ian Bannen who, as Baxter, brings off a minor tour de force with his depiction of bewildered, tormented hysteria. The saddest disappointment, though, is Sidney Lumet's portentous and leaden direction. Had he been able to inject the pace, crispness and audacity of his last film (The Anderson Tapes) into his latest, some of the underlying substance of John Hopkins' script might perhaps have emerged.

TV Guide wrote:

A powerful and complex performance by Connery is somewhat weakened by Lumet's typically stiff and stagey direction, which tends to sap the life out of the film.

=== Accolades ===
Ian Bannen was nominated for a 1974 BAFTA Award for Best Actor in a Supporting Role, but lost to Arthur Lowe for O Lucky Man.

== Home media ==
In 2004, MGM UK released a DVD of the film which contained no extras or trailers. Simultaneous releases from MGM were made in other PAL-format countries, such as Germany and Australia. On 20 October 2008, the film was again released on DVD in the UK by Optimum Releasing, again without extras or trailers. A French Region 2 DVD, preserving the film's original ratio of 1.66:1, became available in 2009. In April 2010, MGM put the film out on a US DVD-R "on demand" for the first time. It is available as an exclusive from Amazon.com and contains no extras.

In 2014 the film was released on Blu-ray in the US, and in 2015 it was released in the UK in the same format.

== This Story of Yours ==
John Hopkins' original play, This Story of Yours, takes the form of three dialogues between Johnson and, in Act One, Maureen, then Cartwright in Act Two and Baxter in Act Three. Directed by Christopher Morahan, it opened at London's Royal Court Theatre on 11 December 1968. The cast was as follows:

- Johnson – Michael Bryant
- Maureen – Alethea Charlton
- Cartwright – John Phillips
- Baxter – Gordon Jackson
- Policemen – Edward Clayton, Steven Barnes, Oliver Maguire, Colin Pinney

The first major revival of the play was directed by Jack Gold at London's Hampstead Theatre, opening on 5 February 1987 with the following cast:

- Johnson – David Suchet
- Maureen – Jane Wood
- Cartwright – Bryan Pringle
- Baxter – James Hazeldine
- Det Sgt Jessard – Richard Cubison
- Police Constables – Paul Fryer, Frederick Lane
