= Amen Corner, Berkshire =

Area of Bracknell, Berkshire, England

Coordinates: 51.41275°N 0.782669°W

Amen Corner
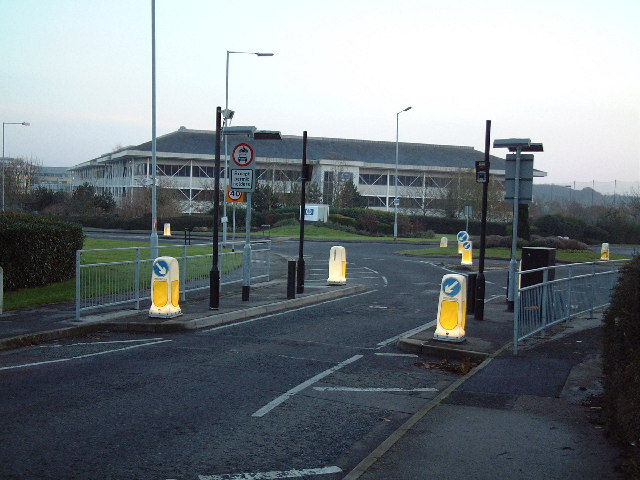
- Amen Corner Business Park

- Location within Berkshire
- OS grid reference: SU846689
- Civil parish: Binfield
- Unitary authority: Bracknell Forest
- Ceremonial county: Berkshire
- Region: South East
- Country: England
- Sovereign state: United Kingdom
- Post town: BRACKNELL
- Postcode district: RG12, RG42
- Dialling code: 01344
- Police: Thames Valley
- Fire: Royal Berkshire
- Ambulance: South Central
- UK Parliament: Maidenhead

Amen Corner is a suburb of Bracknell, Berkshire, England within the civil parish of Binfield, approximately 1.5 miles (2.4 km) west of Bracknell. It is south of the B3408 between Popeswood and Wokingham.

It was formerly the location of Binfield Brickworks, and the John Nike Leisuresport Complex. It also had a well-known music shop which specialised in guitars, bass guitars and drums. It is now home to the Coppid Beech Hotel, and a number of hi-tech industries, including the UK Head Offices for 3M, Hewlett-Packard, Dell and Fujitsu Technology Solutions.

Amen Corner is split into Amen Corner North and Amen Corner South.

== Amen Corner North ==
Amen Corner North lies between London Road and Murrell Hill Lane. Murrell Hill Lane is home to Bracknell businessman, John Nike.

Amen Corner North currently consists of fields which traditionally hosted circuses in the summer. In August 2014, Wilson Developments received outline planning permission to build 380 homes and a primary school on the site.

== Amen Corner South ==
To the north of Amen Corner South lies a residential estate which was developed in the 1980s by Thameswey Homes (later bought by George Wimpey). The housing estate had a well-known music shop which specialised in guitars, bass guitars and drums, which closed in 2018, 41 years after opening.

Amen Corner South was the home of the Binfield Brick and Tile Works Company's Binfield Brickworks between the late 19th century and the 1960s. The 60-acre site was purchased by John Nike OBE DL in 1969 through his company Key Properties Ltd (the Nike Group of Companies). The original plan was to build a garden centre on it.

Part of the site was home to the John Nike Leisuresport Complex, which comprised the Bracknell Ski and Snowboard Centre which opened in 1985 and Bracknell Ice Rink which opened in 1987. Adjacent to this is the four star, 205-bedroom Coppid Beech Hotel, which has an alpine ski lodge design and which was opened in 1992. There is also a small residential development opposite the entrance to the Coppid Beech Hotel, Braeside, whose dwellings look like ski lodges to blend in with the surrounding area. All of these developments are accessed via John Nike Way, which is privately owned by the Nike Group of Companies.

To pay for these ventures, the Nike Group of Companies sold part of its land to Hewlett-Packard and the area now houses the UK Head Office for Hewlett-Packard at the Amen Corner Business Park, and the UK Head Offices for Dell, 3M and Fujitsu Technology Solutions.

A further part of Amen Corner South is owned by the property company Helical Bar.

In August 2014, the Nike Group of Companies was granted outline planning permission to develop the remaining part of its land (which was originally to house a garden centre), along with the land owned by Helical Bar, for 550 homes, a neighbourhood centre with shops and restaurants and a primary school.

The John Nike Leisuresport Complex was demolished in June 2022 after its closure in March 2020, with plans to turn the area into and industrial space.

== History ==
From the late 19th century to the 1960s, brick-making was an important industry in the area, with the Binfield Brick and Tile works being an important employer. This is now the site of the old John Nike Leisuresport Complex. Binfield bricks were partly used to construct the Royal Albert Hall.

== In popular culture ==
- In 1994 both the exterior and interior of the 'Nebditch Intercontinental Hotel' which features throughout episode 2 of the 1st series of the television drama series Pie in the Sky, "The Truth Will Out", was filmed at the Coppid Beech Hotel. The adjoining Bracknell Ski and Snowboard Centre is also featured.
- In the 1996 family drama film Loch Ness, the internal scenes of the conference room and the hotel lobby area were shot at the Coppid Beech Hotel's Sequoia Suite and Lounge.
- In 1998 the Bracknell Ski Centre was featured in episode 19 of the 21st series of the television drama series Grange Hill. The Hewlett-Packard UK Head Office can also be clearly seen in the background.
- In 1998 the Octagon Toyota car dealership (part of the Jemca Car Group since 2012) off John Nike Way was seen in episode 20 of the 21st series of the television drama series Grange Hill.
- The John Nike Leisure Centre was mentioned in the 2002 comedy film Ali G Indahouse.
- In 2005 Bracknell Ice Rink was featured in the television drama serial Secret Smile.
- In 2014 the John Nike Leisuresport Complex car park served as the Bracknell production headquarters of the second series of the television drama series Broadchurch, which was originally aired in 2015, whilst filming was taking place at the nearby Jennett's Park housing estate.
