= Bullbrook =

Suburb of Bracknell, Berkshire, in England

Coordinates: 51.416639°N 0.729490°W

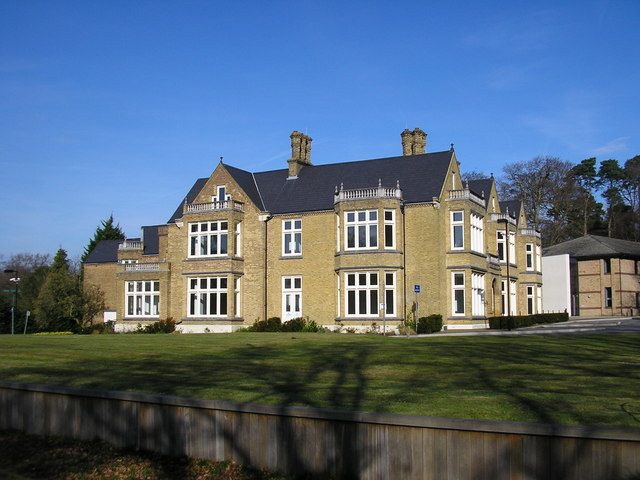
- Lily Hill House

- Location within Berkshire
- OS grid reference: SU887692
- Metropolitan borough: Bracknell Forest
- Metropolitan county: Berkshire
- Region: South East
- Country: England
- Sovereign state: United Kingdom
- Post town: BRACKNELL
- Postcode district: RG12
- Dialling code: 01344
- Police: Thames Valley
- Fire: Royal Berkshire
- Ambulance: South Central
- UK Parliament: Bracknell

Bullbrook is a suburb of Bracknell, in the English county of Berkshire, formerly part of the parish of Winkfield. It is named after the Bull Brook which runs through the area, although most of the brook now runs underground in culverts. Bullbrook is one of the earlier estates of Bracknell and was built in the late 1950s.

The estate lies largely north of the A329 road and its borders begin immediately east of Bracknell town centre. The section between the A329 and the railway line, Bullbrook 4, is now part of Harmans Water ward following boundary changes in 2003.

Facilities include a small shopping centre, a community centre, several public houses and Holly Spring school. Lily Hill Park is an extensive area of woodland and historic parkland. Within the park is Lily Hill House, built between 1814 and 1817 and now used as a business centre.

The eastern industrial area is a business area. The Royal Berkshire Bracknell Clinic is at Brants Bridge.

Kezia Obama, the stepmother of United States President Barack Obama, was a resident of Bullbrook until her death in 2021.
