= Popeswood =

Village in Berkshire, England

Coordinates: 51.421437°N 0.783802°W

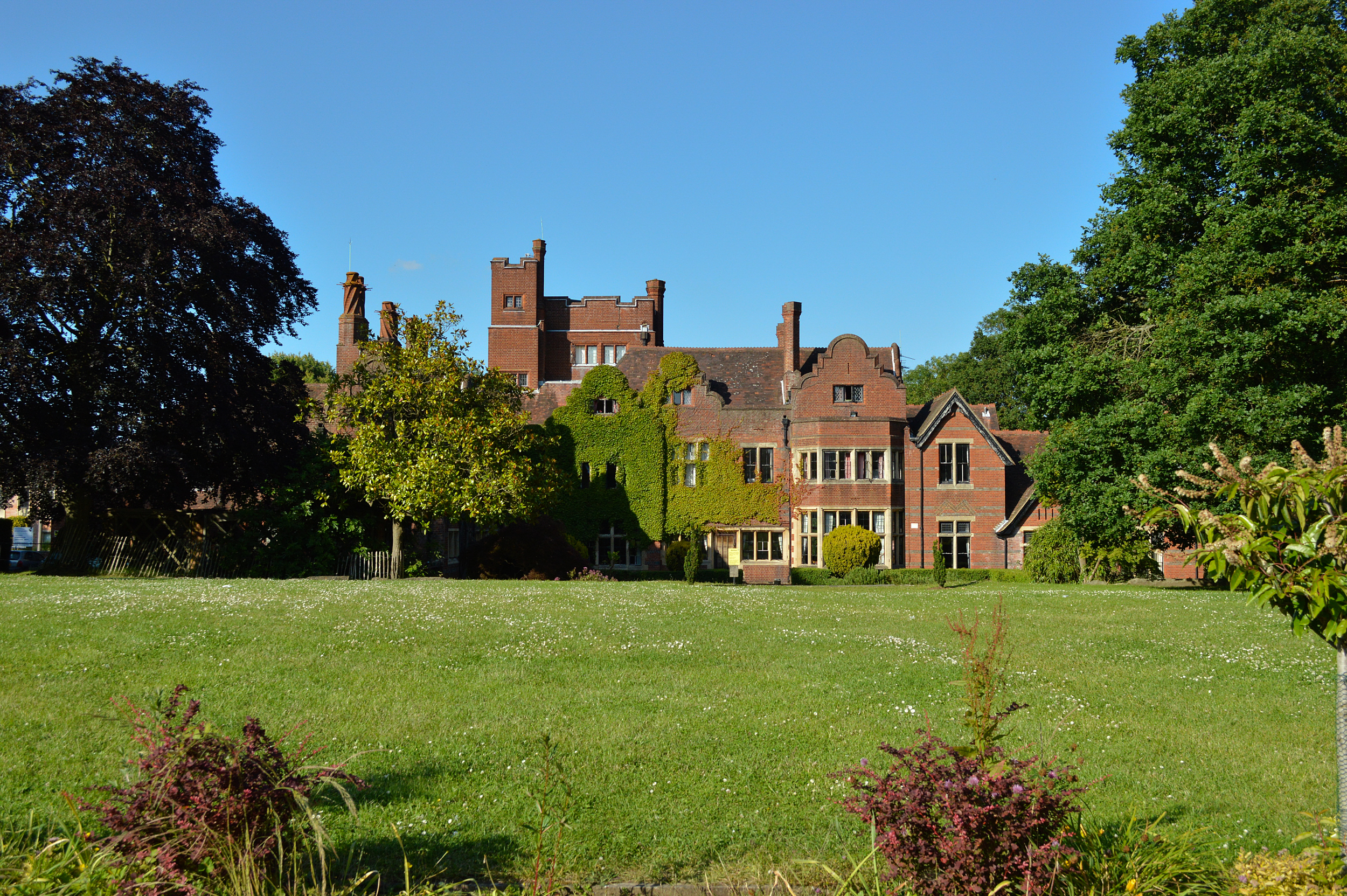
- Newbold College

- Location within Berkshire
- OS grid reference: SU846695
- Civil parish: Binfield
- Unitary authority: Bracknell Forest
- Ceremonial county: Berkshire
- Region: South East
- Country: England
- Sovereign state: United Kingdom
- Post town: BRACKNELL
- Postcode district: RG42
- Dialling code: 01344
- Police: Thames Valley
- Fire: Royal Berkshire
- Ambulance: South Central
- UK Parliament: Maidenhead

Popeswood is a village in Berkshire, England, near Bracknell. The village is within the civil parish of Binfield approximately 1.5 miles (2.4 km) west of Bracknell. The main part of Popeswood lies north of the B3408 west of Temple Park and south of Binfield village, with a smaller section south of the B3408 between Amen Corner and Farley Wood.

== Amenities ==
Along London Road, the B3408, there are a post office, a garage and a number of small businesses.

=== Parks ===
Nearby Pope's Meadow is a countryside park that offers recreational facilities with open grassland, ponds, copse and mature oak trees.

=== Newbold College ===
Binfield is home to Newbold College, a Seventh-day Adventist college and church. There are two Church of England churches, named All Saints' on Terrace Road North and St Mark's on St Mark's Road. There is also Binfield Free Church on Chapel Lane, behind the old Roebuck pub. In addition to the college, Newbold has its own Seventh-day Adventist primary school. Binfield also has a Church of England Primary School with about 420 pupils, and a day nursery. There used to be a Pre-school at Memorial Hall.

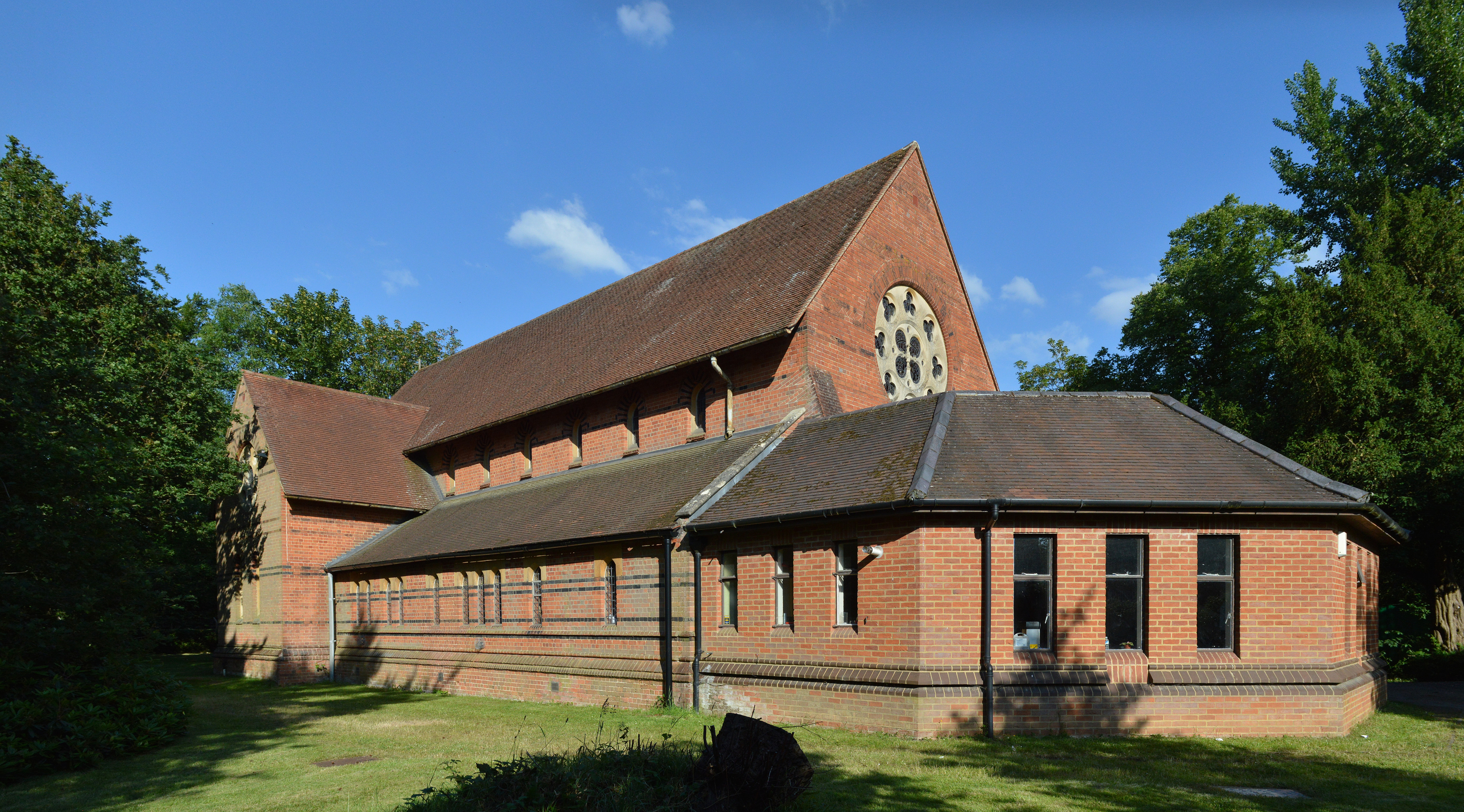
St Mark's Church was built in 1867 and is a Grade II listed building.

== Alexander Pope at Popeswood ==
Popeswood is named after the family of the poet Alexander Pope who lived in Pope's Manor, then called Whitehill House, between 1700 and 1715. Pope was born to Alexander Pope Snr. (1646–1717) a linen merchant of Plough Court, Lombard Street, London, and Edith Pope (née Turner) (1643–1733), who were both Catholics. Shortly after William III and Mary II became joint monarchs in 1689, Catholics were expelled from the City of London. The Popes moved up river to Hammersmith, but in 1700 they relocated Popeswood in Binfield. There, the principal manor house, Binfield Manor, was held by the Catholic Dancastle family. The village was also only seven miles across the heath from Hall Grove, Bagshot, in Surrey. This was the home of Magdalen Rackett, Mr Pope's daughter by his first wife.

It was through Magdalen's husband Charles Rackett that Pope had been able, in 1698, to purchase Whitehill House, a small manor house in fourteen acres of land in Binfield. The house has been known successively as Binfield Lodge, The Firs and Arthurstone. Now much altered, and renamed Pope's Manor, it was for some years the southern headquarters of the construction company Bryant Homes (later Taylor Wimpey), who refurbished the then much neglected property. But if Queen Anne was capable of acts of clemency towards individual Catholics, she showed no compromise to Catholics in general. In 1706 she made it a treasonable offence to convert anyone to Catholicism. She ordered the enforcement of the laws against Catholics and had a census made of the Number of Papists in every Parish, with their Qualities, Estates and Places of Abode.

The Catholic population of the Thames Valley area remained fairly static at about 1 per cent. In Berkshire, for example, there were 293 known or suspected Catholics. In the city of Oxford there were fourteen. In the spring of 1714 Pope returned to his parents' home in Binfield from one of his frequent periods in London. With him came the poet Thomas Parnell, a charming Irish Anglican clergyman who was greatly liked by the Catholic household. Two months later Parnell revisited Binfield and from there he and Pope travelled to Letcombe Bassett, 3 miles (5 km) southwest of Wantage. In the spring of 1715, Alexander Pope paid his last visit to the family home in Binfield, Windsor Forest. Whitehill House, his parents' home, had been sold and a few weeks later they moved to Twickenham. Where Popes House still stands to this day.
