= Quelm Park =

Area of Bracknell, Berkshire, England

Coordinates: 51.42852°N 0.7509°W

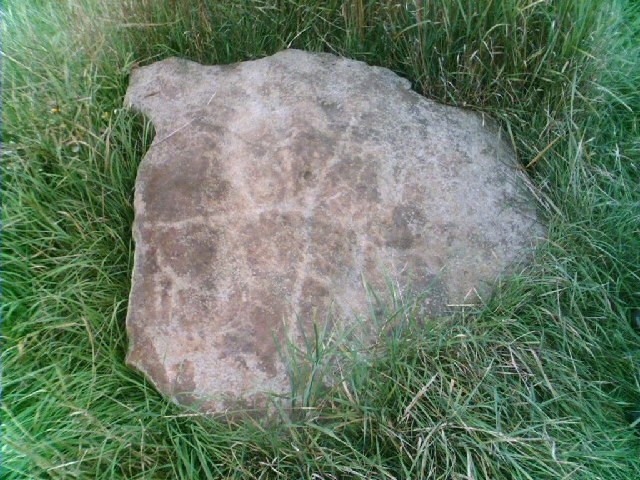
- The Quelm Stone

- Location within Berkshire
- OS grid reference: SU869707
- Civil parish: Warfield
- Unitary authority: Bracknell Forest
- Ceremonial county: Berkshire
- Region: South East
- Country: England
- Sovereign state: United Kingdom
- Post town: BRACKNELL
- Postcode district: RG42
- Dialling code: 01344
- Police: Thames Valley
- Fire: Royal Berkshire
- Ambulance: South Central
- UK Parliament: Bracknell

Quelm Park is a suburb of Bracknell, in Berkshire, England.

The settlement lies west of the A3095 road, south of the Bracknell Northern Distributor Road "Harvest Ride" and is approximately 0.75 miles (1.21 km) north of Bracknell town centre.

It takes its name from "Quelm Lane", an ancient thoroughfare that runs north–south through the development. "Quelm" is thought to mean "gibbet" and may be derived from the Old English cwelm, cwealm meaning 'death, murder, slaughter'.

Quelm Park was built in the latter 1990s as a planned urban extension to Bracknell; however it lies entirely within the parish of Warfield, forming the Quelm Ward of Warfield Parish Council.

== The Quelm Stone ==
The Quelm Stone is a standing stone located near the Quelm Park Roundabout on Harvest Ride, at OS grid reference SU 8697 7087. It is made of sandstone, measures 1460mm long, 995mm wide and 260mm deep, and is estimated to weigh 1,158 kg. It is thought to have been deposited here about 14,000 years ago by a retreating glacier during the last glacial period.
