= The Lexicon, Bracknell =

Coordinates: 51°25′3″N 0°45′0″W

The Lexicon
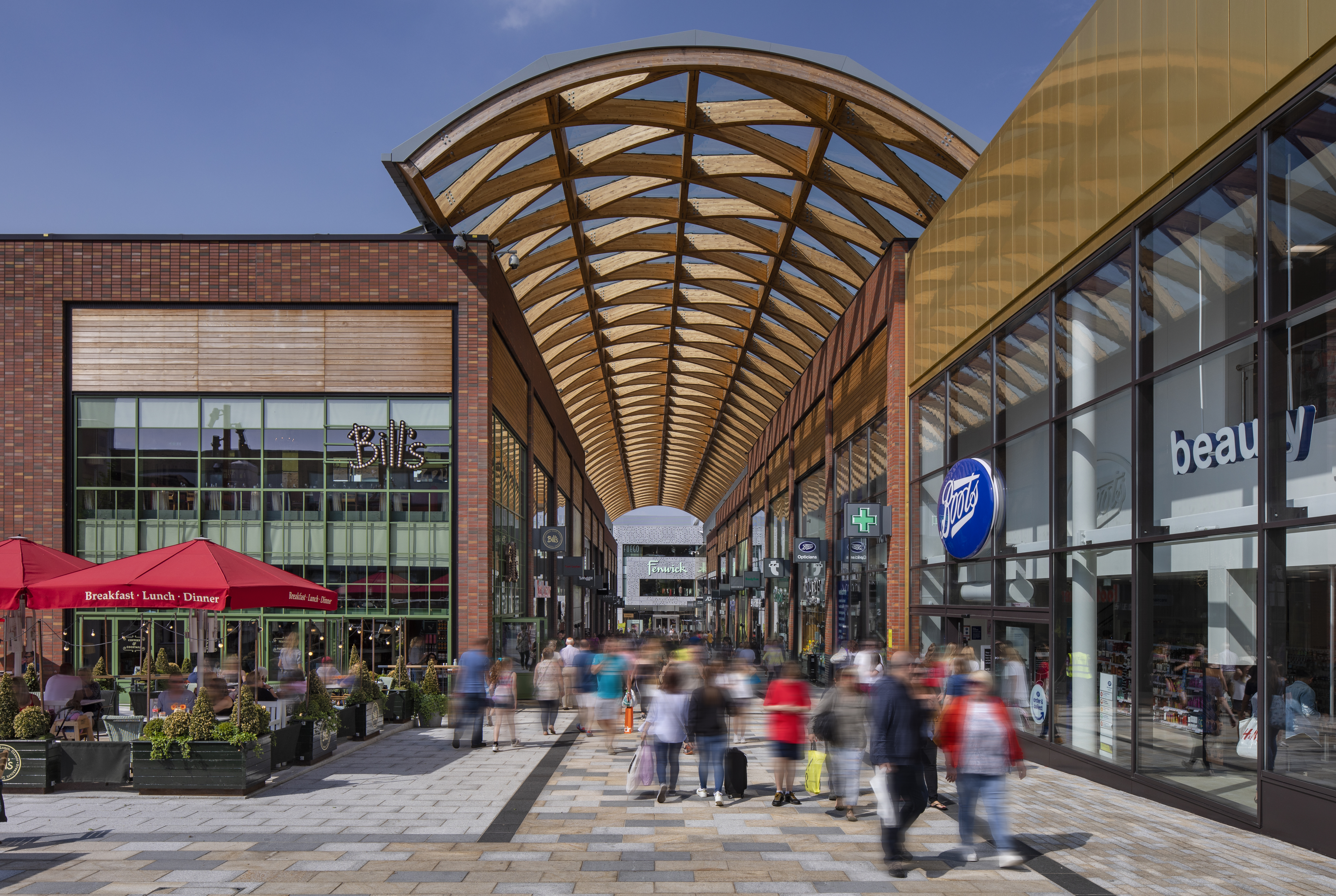
- Location: Bracknell, Berkshire, England
- Opened: 7 September 2017; 9 years ago
- Developer: The Bracknell Regeneration Partnership
- Owner: Realty Income
- Num. of stores: 166
- Num. of anchor tenants: 8
- Floor area: 1,200,000 sq ft (111,484 m^{2})
- Floors: 1
- Parking: The Avenue, 1254 spaces High Street, 970 spaces Braccan Walk, 760 spaces Princess Square, 534 spaces
- Website: thelexiconbracknell.com

The Lexicon is a retail and leisure destination located in Bracknell, Berkshire. It was part of a wider regeneration project in the town, which saw a third of its centre demolished. The Lexicon was then constructed on the site and opened in 2017.

At the time of opening, it had 70 stores, restaurants, and a cinema growing to 160 by 2026. It was visited by Queen Elizabeth II in 2018.

The Lexicon is a privately owned shopping and leisure destination in Bracknell, Berkshire, occupying approximately 1.6 million square feet (150,000 m²) of the town centre. Developed as part of Bracknell's regeneration programme, it operates under a single ownership model, enabling a coordinated approach to estate management, security, cleaning, maintenance, and customer experience.

The destination includes a range of retail, leisure, dining, and community facilities. Alongside its commercial offering, The Lexicon hosts regular events and community programmes throughout the year, supporting its role as a key civic and commercial hub within Bracknell.

== Background ==
In 2010, a 580,000 sq ft (54,000 m^{2}) development received planning permission for the redevelopment of Bracknell's town centre. The concept would regenerate part of the town centre and focus on retail and hospitality. Plans for the wider regeneration of Bracknell had been discussed for around a decade before the development broke ground in 2012. The development would see a third of Bracknell's town centre demolished due to its brutalist architecture. The Lexicon was a 50:50 joint venture between Legal & General Capital and Schroder UK Real Estate Fund. They collaborated with Bracknell Forest Council to develop the masterplan.

While under construction, the development was given the name "The Lexicon" in 2015. In 2017, the redevelopment of Bracknell town centre was completed and The Lexicon opened on 7 September. The regeneration project cost a total of £240 million. Upon completion, the new shopping district in Bracknell covered more than one million sq ft, with 70 new shops and restaurants and a cinema.

Shortly after its one-year anniversary, The Lexicon hosted Queen Elizabeth II when she visited Bracknell to witness what was referred to as "one of the biggest town centre regenerations in the UK."

In 2019, a second phase of the project began. A total of £30 million was secured for the redesign of Princes Square and the regeneration started in the same year.

In November 2025, it was announced The Lexicon had been acquired by the San Diego–headquartered real estate investment trust, Realty Income for approximately £150M.

== Retail and leisure ==
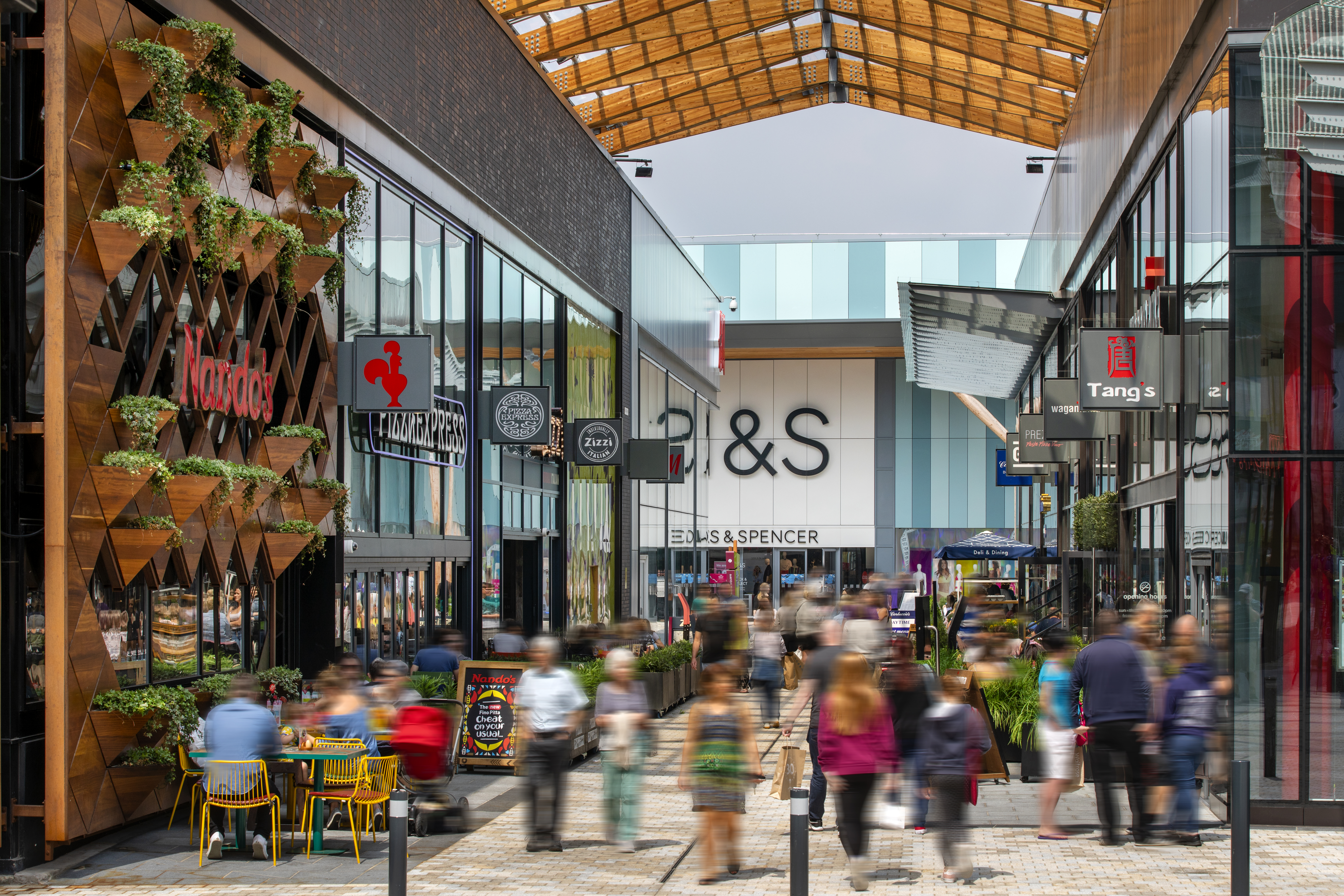
Retail & Leisure destination in Bracknell, United Kingdom

When The Lexicon opened in 2017, it announced a number of notable tenants. The Avenue hosted two anchor tenants, Marks & Spencer and Fenwick.

Other retailers included Joules, FatFace, Superdry, Office, Next, H&M, River Island, Timberland, Paperchase, The Body Shop, Topshop, and Primark. Pandora also chose to open a store at The Lexicon in 2017.

The hospitality and leisure part of the development opened with a 12-screen Cineworld, with restaurants including Nandos, Wagamama, Gourmet Burger Kitchen, and Carluccio's.

== Location and transport ==
The development is located in the town centre of Bracknell, Berkshire. Bracknell was one of the UK's new towns launched in the 1950s. The town is located between the M4 and M3 motorways, and around 30 miles (48 km) from central London.

The regeneration led to a purpose-built car park that would hold up to 4,000 cars. Other transport improvements were also made to the area.

== Future plans ==
The 2017 opening of The Lexicon marked the second phase of Bracknell's regeneration, with further plans to redevelop the town centre.
