= Heads Hill =

Hamlet in Berkshire, England

Coordinates: 51°22′24″N 1°16′18″W

- Hamlet
- Location within Berkshire
- OS grid reference: SU590639
- Metropolitan borough: West Berkshire
- Metropolitan county: Berkshire
- Region: South East
- Country: England
- Sovereign state: United Kingdom
- Post town: Thatcham
- Postcode district: RG19
- Dialling code: 0118
- Police: Thames Valley
- Fire: Royal Berkshire
- Ambulance: South Central
- UK Parliament: Berkshire

Heads Hill is a hamlet on Crookham Common in the civil parish of Thatcham in the English county of Berkshire.

It lies near to the A339 off Thornford Road, and is located approximately 3 miles (4.8 km) south-east of Newbury, and the same south-west of Thatcham. Goldfinch Bottom is to the north and the Greenham Business Park to the west.
