= The Brakenhale School =

Location
- Rectory Lane; Bracknell, Berkshire, RG12 7BA; England; 51.4069°N 0.7514°W

Information
- Other name: Brakenhale
- Former name: Borough Green City Secondary School
- Type: Academy
- Established: 1958
- Local authority: Bracknell Forest Council
- Trust: Greenshaw Learning Trust
- Department for Education URN: 142577 Tables
- Ofsted: Reports
- Head teacher: Camilla Douglas
- Gender: Mixed
- Age range: 11–18
- Enrolment: 1,076 (2019)
- Capacity: 1,094
- Houses: Farley; Swinley; Temple; Jennetts
- Website: www.brakenhale.co.uk

The Brakenhale School (simply referred to as Brakenhale and formerly Borough Green City Secondary School) is an 11–18 mixed, secondary school and sixth form with academy status in Bracknell, Berkshire, England. It was formerly a community school that was established in 1958 and became an academy in April 2016. It is part of the Greenshaw Learning Trust.

== History ==
The Brakenhale School was formerly a community school that was established in 1958 as Borough Green City Secondary School. It became an academy as part of the Greenshaw Learning Trust in April 2016. In 2020, the school underwent complete reconstruction and utilised online learning during the COVID-19 pandemic.

== Controversy ==
The school's strict policies have attracted some criticism, including complaints of restrictions on toilet breaks, sixth form dress code and a ban on facial hair that was subsequently lifted.

== House system ==
The school implemented a house system in 2018 consisting of four houses which are named after the local community and represented by a colour. The names were chosen from suggestions submitted by the students and staff; they are each allocated to a house. Students receive a badge which represents the house they are in, a planner in their house colour, and attend house assemblies every half-term. The houses are:

- Farley — blue
- Swinley — red
- Temple — green
- Jennetts — yellow

== Notable alumni ==
- Richard Cousins, businessman
