= Lower Denford =

Hamlet in Berkshire, England

Coordinates: 51°24′55″N 1°29′42″W

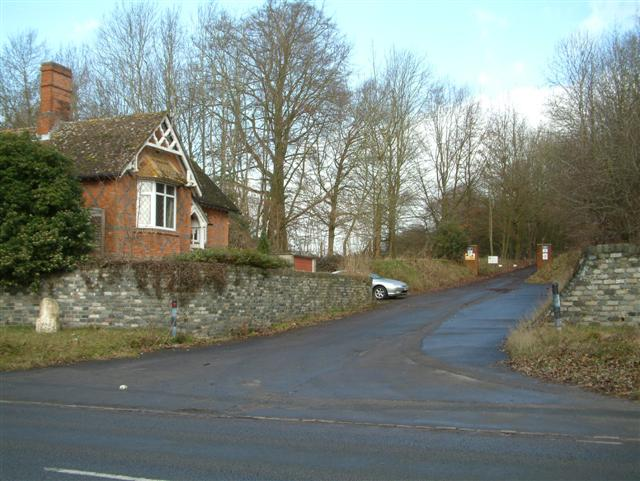
- Denford Lodge

- Location within Berkshire
- OS grid reference: SU351685
- Civil parish: Kintbury
- Unitary authority: West Berkshire
- Shire county: Berkshire
- Region: South East
- Country: England
- Sovereign state: United Kingdom
- Post town: Hungerford
- Postcode district: RG17
- Dialling code: 01488
- Police: Thames Valley
- Fire: Royal Berkshire
- Ambulance: South Central
- UK Parliament: Berkshire

Lower Denford is a hamlet in the civil parish of Kintbury in the English county of Berkshire.

The settlement lies adjacent to the A4 road, and is located approximately 7 miles east of Hungerford town hall.
