= Whitegrove =

Suburb of Bracknell, Berkshire, England

Coordinates: 51.425610°N 0.730441°W

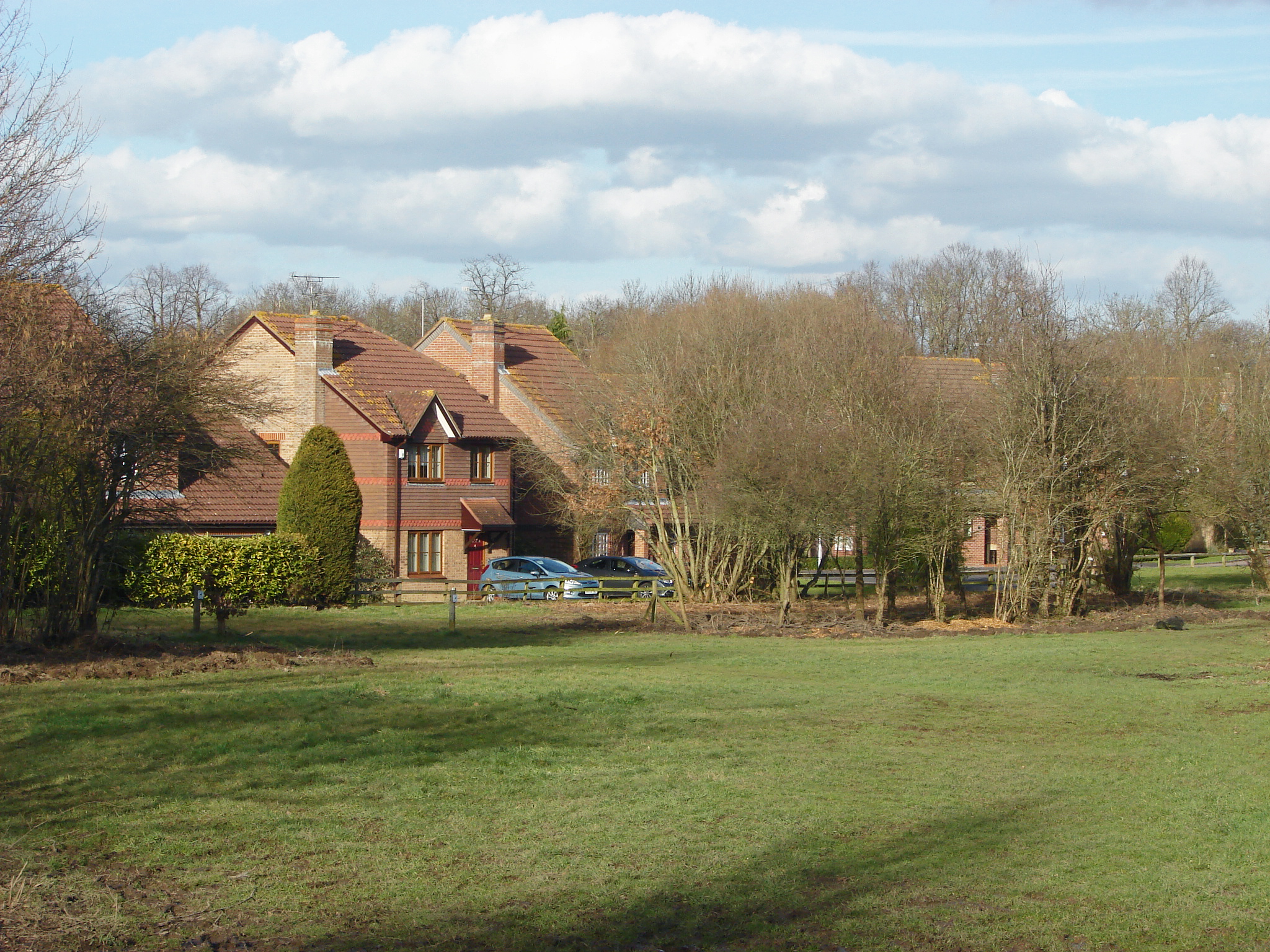

- Location within Berkshire
- OS grid reference: SU883703
- Metropolitan borough: Bracknell Forest
- Metropolitan county: Berkshire
- Region: South East
- Country: England
- Sovereign state: United Kingdom
- Post town: BRACKNELL
- Postcode district: RG42
- Dialling code: 01344
- Police: Thames Valley
- Fire: Royal Berkshire
- Ambulance: South Central
- UK Parliament: Bracknell

Whitegrove or Warfield Green is a suburb of Bracknell in the English county of Berkshire. It stands within the bounds of the civil parish of Warfield.

== Geography ==
The settlement lies north of the A329 road and is approximately 1 mile (1.6 km) north-east of Bracknell town centre.

== Government ==
Electorally, Whitegrove comes under the Whitegrove ward of Bracknell Forest Council. It falls within the Bracknell parliamentary constituency.

== Local amenities ==
Local amenities include Whitegrove Primary School and Whitegrove Library.

Whitegrove Football Club has over 360 children, boys and Girls, ranging from under 7's to under 17's playing in a number of local leagues.

On the edges of Whitegrove there is are two local nature reserves: Hayley Green Wood, located to the north, and Whitegrove Copse, located to the west.
