= Binfield =

Coordinates: 51°25′55″N 0°47′31″W

- Village and civil parish
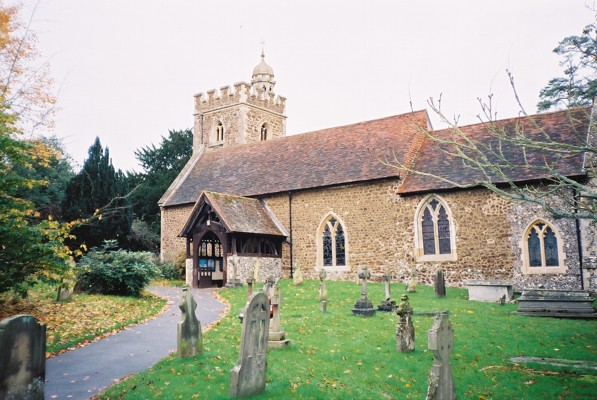
- All Saints' Church

- Location within Berkshire
- Population: 9,943 (2021 Census)
- OS grid reference: SU8471
- Civil parish: Binfield
- Unitary authority: Bracknell Forest
- Ceremonial county: Berkshire
- Region: South East
- Country: England
- Sovereign state: United Kingdom
- Post town: BRACKNELL
- Postcode district: RG12, RG42
- Dialling code: 01344
- Police: Thames Valley
- Fire: Royal Berkshire
- Ambulance: South Central
- UK Parliament: Maidenhead

Binfield is a village and civil parish in Berkshire, England, which at the 2021 census had a population of 9,943. The village lies 2 miles (3.2 km) north-west of Bracknell, 3 miles (4.8 km) north-east of Wokingham, and 8 miles (13 km) south-east of Reading at the westernmost extremity of the Greater London Urban Area.

== Geography ==
Much of modern Binfield stretches towards the south and east of the original village. Parts of the parish are now suburbs of Bracknell including Amen Corner, Farley Wood (including Farley Copse), Popeswood and Temple Park; while Billingbear is a small hamlet north-west of the church.

== History ==
The name Binfield derived from the Old English beonet + feld and means "open land where bent-grass grows". The surrounding forest was cleared after the Windsor Forest Act 1813 (53 Geo. 3. c. 158) when forestal rights were abolished and people bought parcels of land for agriculture; it was at this point that villages like Binfield expanded, when there was work for farm labourers.

The Stag and Hounds was reportedly used as a hunting lodge by Henry VIII and Elizabeth I, and an elm tree outside it (the stump of which was finally removed in 2003) was said to mark the centre of Windsor Forest. Rumley Bowes, elder brother of John Bowes, 1st Baron Bowes, lived here in the later eighteenth century and inherited his brother's fortune in 1767. John Constable spent his honeymoon at the Rectory in 1816 and sketched All Saints' Church twice. The presence of large houses in the area, most of them without estates to support them, meant that many tradesmen could make a living in the village and Binfield continued to flourish until the development of Bracknell New Town.

== Local government ==
Binfield is part of Bracknell Forest and the local authority is Bracknell Forest Council. However, the village is within the parliamentary constituency of Maidenhead, thus Binfield is represented by a different Member of Parliament to Bracknell.

== Amenities ==
=== Public houses ===
Binfield has two public houses: The Victoria Arms and the Stag and Hounds. In addition to these there were a number of former public houses in the village, which included an ancient ale house along Wicks Green, the Kicking Donkey, a since- demolished public house along Red Rose, The White Horse, The Jolly Farmer, which stood in Howe Lane, the Royal Standard, Shoulder of Mutton, The Beehive, The Roebuck and The Jack O'Newbury.

The White Horse was an almshouse endowed by the Duke of York, and was known at the time as the white house because of its white exterior.

=== Sport ===
Binfield has a cricket club, Binfield CC founded in 1865. They celebrated their 150th anniversary by hosting an MCC X1 and paying a return fixture at Lord's. They became champions of the Morrants Chiltern League for the very first time in 2009. The village has a football team, founded by the brick makers of the village in 1892. Binfield F.C. is a Step 5, FA Community Standard club, with 32 teams from Under 7s to Veterans, including girls' teams. The first team played in the FA Cup for the first time in season 2009–10, after being promoted to the Hellenic Football League Premier Division from Division 1 East, which they won in 2008–09. The first team won The AM Print & Copy Floodlit cup in April 2012. Binfield is also the home to The Bowmen Of Warfield archery club who have their own field on Hill Farm Lane. Bowmen of Warfield have over 150 members.

=== Parks ===
The village has four main parks: one at Wicks Green, one at Silver Jubilee Fields, one at Popes Meadow and the fourth at Foxley Fields, next to Binfield Primary School. The park at Wicks Green has a Trim Trail around the perimeter and a Cableway. The play area has recently been refurbished, with a large swing, climbing blocks, and multi-purpose frame – all designed for older children. Silver Jubilee Fields is next to Wicks Green and is separated by a pond. At the northern side of these fields, is an area of specimen trees, including Black Walnut, Pin Oak, White Berried Elderberry and Persian Ironwood. There is also a small play area for younger children, which includes swings and a climbing frame.

Popes Meadow, a Green Flag park, has large grassed areas, a large pond and a small play-park for younger children. Foxley Fields has three all-weather tennis courts which are managed by the Binfield Tennis Association and a play area with a climbing frame, spinner and swings. For the older children and teenagers there is an all-weather pitch, with basketball hoops, integral cricket stumps and markings for several games. Recently, a brand new play area has been installed at Foxley Fields, with a trampoline, a tunnel, a climbing rock, various swings and a bridge and stepping stones.

=== Historic country houses ===
In the 16th century, Reading was the tenth richest town in the country. An old story of uncertain origin claims that the Abbots of Reading Abbey established a retreat at Elm Grove. Although the house has since been rebuilt, the street name Monk's Alley (which runs westwards from Binfield House) is supposed to survive from that association. White Gate, opposite, is a significant hall house dates from the 15th century. Binfield Manor is currently owned by the Sultan of Brunei. The grounds of Binfield Place are used every summer for a large party for locals, called "Party at the Place".

Binfield House, similar in appearance to Horace Walpole's Strawberry Hill House near Twickenham (a Grade II listed building) was built in 1776 and for nearly 150 years was rented out to a number of tenants including the well-known historian Catharine Macaulay, whose work was greatly admired by the 1st American President George Washington, and in 1788 she travelled to America to visit him. In the mid-19th century the house was used for at least 35 years as a small school. In 1928 it was purchased by Lady Knox who with her husband Major General Knox rebuilt and greatly extended the house under the guidance of the architect Nugent Cachemaille-Day. Binfield House was sold in 1974 to the then Bracknell District Council. Early maps show the much larger Binfield Park as Binfield House, so the name of Binfield House may have been different in the late 18th and into the middle part of the 19th century, although the map of 1883 certainly confirms the use of the name by then. Previously, the house may have been called 'Wyhtwicks' after its builder. Its grounds contain a small Ha-Ha, a half buried pillbox and a former walled kitchen garden.

=== Alexander Pope in Binfield ===
The author and poet Alexander Pope lived at what is now called Pope's Manor in Popeswood with his parents when he was young. He sang in the local church choir.
