= Wildridings =

Coordinates: 51°24′25″N 0°45′36″W

- Suburb
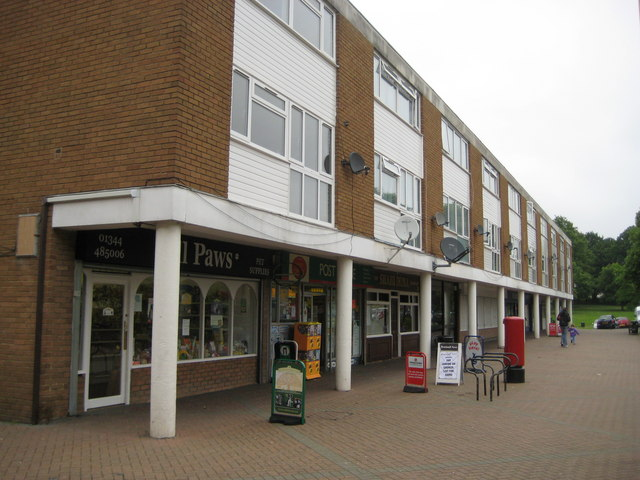
- Wildridings Shops

- Location within Berkshire
- OS grid reference: SU8668
- Civil parish: Bracknell
- Unitary authority: Bracknell Forest
- Ceremonial county: Berkshire
- Region: South East
- Country: England
- Sovereign state: United Kingdom
- Post town: BRACKNELL
- Postcode district: RG12
- Dialling code: 01344
- Police: Thames Valley
- Fire: Royal Berkshire
- Ambulance: South Central
- UK Parliament: Bracknell

Wildridings is a suburb of Bracknell, in Berkshire, England.

The settlement lies between the A322 and A3095 roads, is approximately 1 mile (1.6 km) south-west of Bracknell town centre and is in the Easthampstead & Wildridings local council ward. Wildridings was built in the late 1960s as the new town started expanding beyond the original planned four estates. It was the first estate in the town to use the practice of naming roads in alphabetical order without 'Road' or 'Street', e.g. Arncliffe, Bishopdale, Crossfell - in this case after names of Yorkshire Dales. In addition road traffic and pedestrians routes were separated.

Facilities include a small shopping centre with post office, several public houses and Wildridings Primary School. Mill Pond is a large lake offering leisure facilities, play areas, a skate park and angling. There is no industrial development.

The Offence (1973), a psychological thriller with Sean Connery and Ian Bannen, was filmed in Bracknell. The bulk of the outdoor scenes were taken from March to April, 1972 around Wildridings, specifically Arncliffe, Crossfell, Mill Pond and Mill Lane.
