= Harmans Water =

Area of Bracknell, Berkshire, England

Coordinates: 51.403473°N 0.738849°W

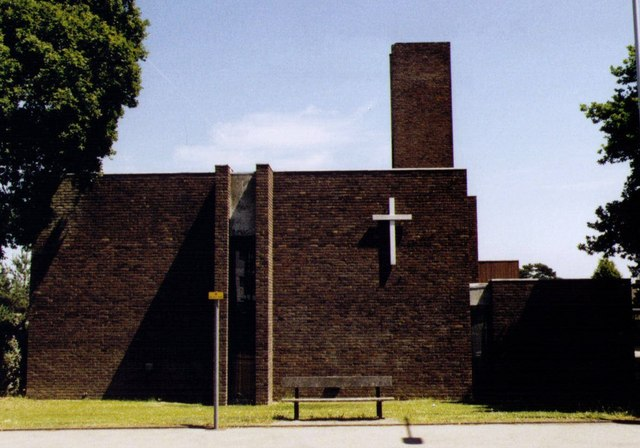
- St Paul's Church

- Location within Berkshire
- OS grid reference: SU877681
- Metropolitan borough: Bracknell Forest
- Metropolitan county: Berkshire
- Region: South East
- Country: England
- Sovereign state: United Kingdom
- Post town: BRACKNELL
- Postcode district: RG12
- Dialling code: 01344
- Police: Thames Valley
- Fire: Royal Berkshire
- Ambulance: South Central
- UK Parliament: Bracknell

Harmans Water is a suburb of Bracknell, in the English county of Berkshire, formerly part of the parish of Winkfield. It takes its name from Harman's Water Lake, long gone. Building of the estate began around 1960 and was the fourth and last estate to be built as part of the original plan for the new town.

The estate lies approximately 1 mile (1.6 km) south-east of the town centre, to the east of the A322 road and south of the A329 road. It is part of the Harmans Water & Crown Wood ward.

Facilities include a shopping centre, a library, several public houses and Harmans Water Primary School . St. Paul's Church has shared Church of England and United Reformed Church services and is situated adjacent to the shopping centre. There are a few office buildings in Broad Lane but otherwise the estate is largely residential.

== The Parks ==
The Parks is a recent development and is on the site of the former country estate and hamlet of Ramslade, which included the RAF Staff College which closed in 1997. The first phase of the development, of 220 homes was developed by English Partnerships after permission was granted in 2003, and completed in 2008. Further development continued with a community centre finished in 2015 and 530 more homes completed by 2017.

Ramslade House, the former headquarters building of the RAF staff college, was originally planned to become a community centre but was demolished in 2016 to make way for a development of 12 townhouses being built by Taylor Wimpey. In order to honour the house, a memorial was built on the site.

In 2018, following the demolition of pub The Blue Lion after its closure in 2014, construction began for a block of apartments known as Harmans House which is located next to the Ramslade Cottages. Construction finished in 2019. In early 2021, Taylor Wimpey transferred ownership of The Parks to Bracknell Forest Council, with their plans to bring the green spaces into use. In 2023, a calisthenics park was installed in one of the open space areas, with ten workout stations for residents to use.
