= Great Hollands =

Coordinates: 51°23′57″N 0°46′14″W

- Suburb
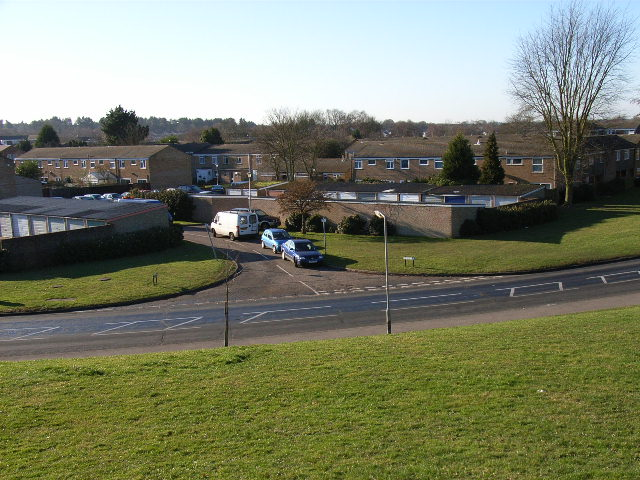

- Location within Berkshire
- OS grid reference: SU855674
- Unitary authority: Bracknell Forest
- Ceremonial county: Berkshire
- Region: South East
- Country: England
- Sovereign state: United Kingdom
- Post town: Bracknell
- Dialling code: 01344
- Police: Thames Valley
- Fire: Royal Berkshire
- Ambulance: South Central
- UK Parliament: Bracknell

Great Hollands is a suburb of Bracknell in Berkshire, England. It takes its name from a medieval field-name of Easthampstead parish, which it was previously in. Building of the estate began around 1967 as the town continued to expand.

The estate lies approximately 1.5 miles (2.4 km) south-west of the town centre, to the west of the A3095 road. Great Hollands is in one ward - Great Hollands.

Facilities include a shopping centre, library, community centre, the William Twigg public house and Great Hollands Primary School . There are a number of light industrial units near the shopping centre.

== History ==
The development of Great Hollands neighbourhood was originally closely linked with the growth of the Bracknell company, Sperry, which was at the time Bracknell's largest employer. The only memory now left of this company is the concrete gyroscope, which is situated on one of the roundabouts on the Wokingham Road, opposite which Sperry's main building once stood. The site is now the Arlington Square Complex.

In the mid-1960s Sperry built an extension to its Bracknell factory so that the work of its Brentford branch could be transferred here. Houses were needed for employees, and, as a result, the development of Great Hollands neighbourhood had to be pushed ahead faster than was originally intended. The first houses were completed in 1967 but the acceleration in the building of the houses led to a longer than usual wait for the provision of other services and facilities. Great Hollands was, at that time, the furthest neighbourhood from the town and the bus service was somewhat inadequate.

Some of the first people to move to Great Hollands complained of the delay in the provision of a primary school, shops (especially a chemist) and public telephones. Temporary shops were provided (two houses in Abbotsbury were used - one a Londis store, and the other a newsagent). A community centre was improvised in converted premises (East Lodge).

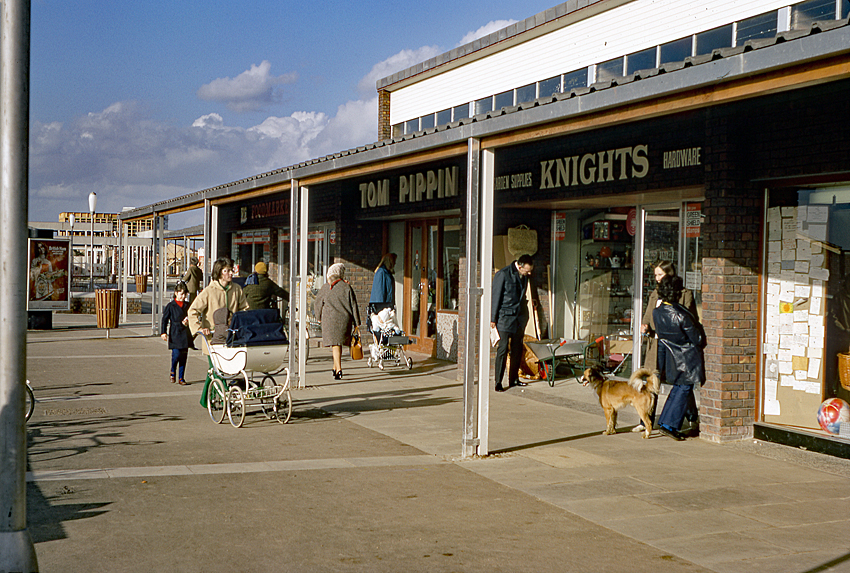
Great Hollands shops in 1971

The population of Great Hollands had passed the 3000 mark before the neighbourhood centre known today began to take shape. Sixteen shops opened during 1971, followed somewhat later by the William Twigg public house and, later still, by a primary school.

In its fully developed form, Great Hollands has a number of features which distinguish it from some of Bracknell's original housing estates. There was a large proportion of private housing built. The neighbourhood centre was planned more comprehensively and included a small amount of light industry. The primary school, a community centre and a branch of the library were all constructed.

In 1976 the town's first purpose-built health centre opened its doors in the Great Hollands neighbourhood centre.

Traffic segregation, which was originally started when Wildridings was constructed, was considerably extended along the same lines in Great Hollands. The neighbourhood streets branched off a circular road called Ringmead and they were all named in alphabetical order: Abbotsbury, Ambassador, Appledore and so on ending with Yardley. Many of the names were very familiar ones to the Londoners who moved here as they were the old names of the London telephone exchanges.
