= Maidenhead (constituency) =

UK Parliament constituency (since 1997)

Coordinates: 51.48°N 0.75°W

- County constituency for the House of Commons
- Boundaries since 2024
- Boundary of Maidenhead in South East England
- County: Berkshire
- Electorate: 73,463 (2023)
- Major settlements: Maidenhead; Bray; Binfield

Current constituency
- Created: 1997
- Member of Parliament: Joshua Reynolds (Liberal Democrats)
- Seats: One
- Created from: Windsor & Maidenhead; Wokingham

Maidenhead is a constituency (Note: A county constituency (for the purposes of election expenses and type of returning officer)) in Berkshire represented in the House of Commons of the Parliament of the United Kingdom by Joshua Reynolds, a Liberal Democrat, since 2024. Following its creation at the 1997 general election, the seat was held for twenty-seven years by Conservative Member of Parliament Theresa May, who served as Home Secretary from 2010 to 2016 and as Prime Minister from 2016 to 2019.

Prior to the 2024 general election, it was considered a safe seat for the Conservative Party.

== Constituency profile ==
Maidenhead is a constituency in Berkshire. It covers the town of Maidenhead—which has a population of around 71,000— and the rural areas surrounding it, including the villages of Cookham, Binfield, Winkfield, North Ascot, Popeswood and Warfield and the Bracknell suburb of Temple Park. Maidenhead is a historic market town and river port on the Thames. The town is well-connected to nearby Slough, Heathrow Airport and London and is home to many middle-class commuters. The constituency is highly affluent with very low levels of deprivation, particularly so in the rural areas. The average house price is nearly double the national average.

In general, residents of Maidenhead are well-educated and likely to be married. They have high rates of homeownership, income and professional employment. A high proportion work in the science and technology sectors; the town forms part of the hi-tech M4 corridor. Rates of child poverty and unemployment are very low. White people made up 80% of the population at the 2021 census. Asians, primarily Indians and Pakistanis, were the largest ethnic minority group at 13%. At the local council level, the town of Maidenhead is represented by Liberal Democrats whilst the rural south of the constituency elected Conservatives and localists. An estimated 54% of voters in the constituency supported remaining in the European Union in the 2016 referendum, higher than the nationwide figure of 48%.

== History ==
The constituency was first drawn shortly after the 1992 general election. The electorate of Maidenhead and Windsor was becoming too large, so the Boundary Commission for England separated the seats for the next election, due in 1996 or 1997. It was formed from parts of the abolished safe seat of Windsor and Maidenhead and the constituency of Wokingham. It was first used in the 1997 election. Theresa May, Prime Minister from 2016 to 2019, has held the seat since its creation. In 1995, May, a former London councillor at the time working at the Association for Payment Clearing Services and as a Foreign affairs advisor, was selected to contest the new seat, defeating her future Chancellor of the Exchequer, Philip Hammond, in the selection process. (Hammond was later selected for the nearby seat of Runnymede and Weybridge). May won the seat in the 1997 election, in which over 100 Conservatives lost their seats, and the party obtained its lowest share of seats in 91 years. At the 2010 general election May achieved the 9th highest share of the vote of the 307 seats held by a Conservative.

Before 2024, the closest election in the seat was in 2001, in which May's majority was cut from almost 12,000 votes in 1997 to just 3,284 votes ahead of the Liberal Democrat candidate. The Labour candidate in that election was activist and comedy writer John O'Farrell, whose campaign was the subject of a BBC documentary entitled Losing My Maidenhead.

Due to their strong performance in 2001, the seat was one of several targeted by the Liberal Democrats in 2005 as part of a 'decapitation strategy' to deprive senior Conservatives of their seats; as with similar efforts in Haltemprice and Howden and West Dorset, however, this strategy was unsuccessful: May retained her seat with almost double her 2001 majority. From that point, she held it with majorities of at least 30%, until she stood down prior to the 2024 general election. The Liberal Democrats would finally gain the seat during the election, with Joshua Reynolds being elected as the new MP for the constituency.

== Boundaries and boundary changes ==
=== 1997–2010 ===
- The Royal Borough of Windsor and Maidenhead wards of Belmont, Bisham and Cookham, Boyn Hill, Cox Green, Furze Platt, Hurley, Oldfield, Pinkney's Green, and St Mary's; and
- The District of Wokingham wards of Charvil, Coronation, Hurst, Remenham and Wargrave, Sonning, and Twyford and Ruscombe.

The Windsor and Maidenhead wards were previously part of the abolished constituency of that name. The Wokingham wards were transferred from the reconfigured constituency thereof.

=== 2010–2024 ===
Map of 2010–2024 boundaries
- The Royal Borough of Windsor and Maidenhead wards of Belmont, Bisham and Cookham, Boyn Hill, Bray, Cox Green, Furze Platt, Hurley and Walthams, Maidenhead Riverside, Oldfield, and Pinkney's Green; and
- The District of Wokingham wards of Charvil, Coronation, Hurst, Remenham, Wargrave and Ruscombe, Sonning, and Twyford.

Bray was transferred from Windsor.

The constituency borders the constituencies of Reading East, Henley, Wycombe, Beaconsfield, Windsor, Bracknell and Wokingham. The seat's largest settlement is the town of Maidenhead in the Royal Borough of Windsor and Maidenhead, Berkshire.

=== 2024–present ===
Further to the 2023 review of Westminster constituencies which came into effect for the 2024 general election, the constituency was defined as comprising the following (as they existed on 1 December 2020):

- The Borough of Bracknell Forest wards of: Ascot; Binfield with Warfield; Winkfield and Cranbourne.^{1}
- The Royal Borough of Windsor and Maidenhead wards of: Belmont; Bisham & Cookham; Boyn Hill; Bray; Cox Green; Furze Platt; Hurley & Walthams; Oldfield; Pinkneys Green; Riverside; St. Mary's.

The District of Wokingham wards were transferred out, mostly to Wokingham (including Twyford) and partly to the new constituency of Earley and Woodley (including Sonning); offset by the addition of the Bracknell Forest wards, including Binfield, from Windsor.

^{1}Following a local government boundary review which came into effect in May 2023, the constituency now includes the following wards of the Borough of Bracknell Forest from the 2024 general election:

- Binfield North & Warfield West (most); Binfield South & Jennett's Park (majority); Swinley Forest (small part); Whitegrove (small part); Winkfield & Warfield East.

== Members of Parliament ==
Election	Member	Party
1997	constituency created from Windsor and Maidenhead & Wokingham	
1997	Theresa May	Conservative
2024	Joshua Reynolds	Liberal Democrats

== Elections ==
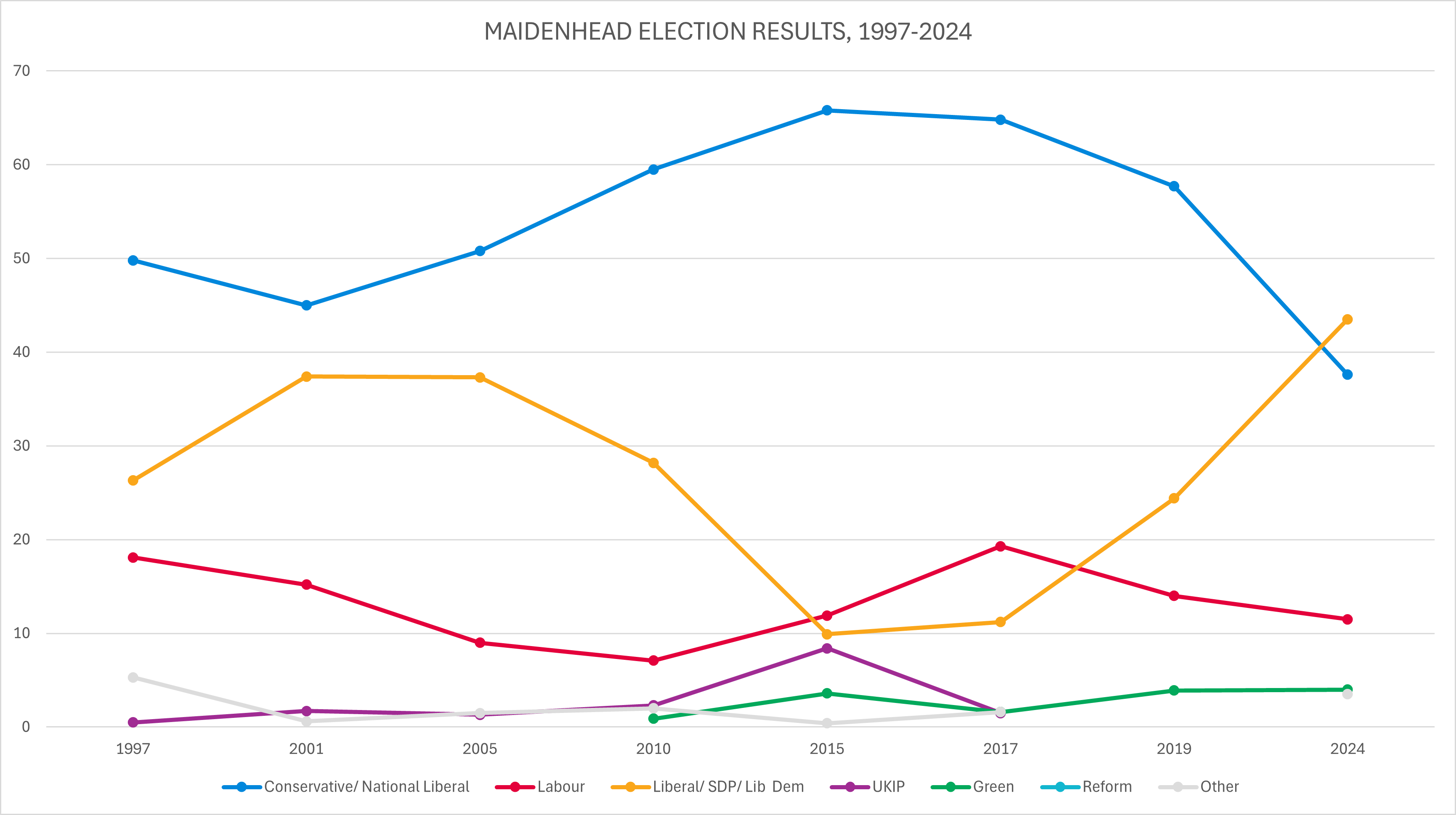
Election results 1997-2024

=== Elections in the 2020s ===
General election 2024: Maidenhead
Party	Candidate	Votes	%	±%
Liberal Democrats	Joshua Reynolds	21,895	43.5	+19.7
Conservative	Tania Mathias	18,932	37.6	−19.8
Labour	Jo Smith	5,766	11.5	−3.5
Green	Andrew Cooney	1,996	4.0	+0.2
Independent	George Wright	791	1.6	N/A
SDP	Timothy Burt	518	1.0	N/A
Independent	Qazi Yasir Irshad	431	0.9	N/A
Majority		2,963	5.9	N/A
Turnout		50,329	66.5	−2.8
Registered electors		75,687		
Liberal Democrats gain from Conservative		Swing	+19.8	

=== Elections in the 2010s ===
2019 notional result
Party	Vote	%
Conservative	29,223	57.4
Liberal Democrats	12,122	23.8
Labour	7,652	15.0
Green	1,917	3.8
Turnout	50,914	69.3
Electorate	73,463	

General election 2019: Maidenhead
Party	Candidate	Votes	%	±%
Conservative	Theresa May	32,620	57.7	−6.9
Liberal Democrats	Joshua Reynolds	13,774	24.4	+13.2
Labour	Patrick McDonald	7,882	14.0	−5.3
Green	Emily Tomalin	2,216	3.9	+2.3
Majority		18,846	33.3	−12.2
Turnout		56,492	73.7	−2.7
Conservative hold		Swing	−10.1	

General election 2017: Maidenhead
Party	Candidate	Votes	%	±%
Conservative	Theresa May	37,718	64.8	−1.0
Labour	Patrick McDonald	11,261	19.3	+7.4
Liberal Democrats	Tony Hill	6,540	11.2	+1.3
Green	Derek Wall	907	1.6	−2.0
UKIP	Gerard Batten	871	1.5	−6.9
Animal Welfare	Andrew Knight	282	0.5	N/A
No label	Lord Buckethead	249	0.4	N/A
Independent	Grant Smith	152	0.3	N/A
Monster Raving Loony	Howling Laud Hope	119	0.2	N/A
CPA	Edmonds Victor	69	0.1	N/A
The Just Political Party	Julian Reid	52	0.1	N/A
Independent	Yemi Hailemariam	16	0.0	N/A
No label	Bobby Smith	3	0.0	N/A
Majority		26,457	45.5	−8.6
Turnout		58,239	76.4	+3.8
Conservative hold		Swing	−4.2	

General election 2015: Maidenhead
Party	Candidate	Votes	%	±%
Conservative	Theresa May	35,453	65.8	+6.3
Labour	Charlie Smith	6,394	11.9	+4.8
Liberal Democrats	Tony Hill	5,337	9.9	−18.3
UKIP	Herbie Crossman	4,539	8.4	+6.1
Green	Emily Blyth	1,915	3.6	+2.7
Independent	Ian Taplin	162	0.3	N/A
Class War	Joe Wilcox	55	0.1	N/A
Majority		29,059	53.9	+22.6
Turnout		53,855	72.6	−1.1
Conservative hold		Swing		

General election 2010: Maidenhead
Party	Candidate	Votes	%	±%
Conservative	Theresa May	31,937	59.5	+7.6
Liberal Democrats	Tony Hill	15,168	28.2	−8.0
Labour	Patrick McDonald	3,795	7.1	−2.1
UKIP	Kenneth Wright	1,243	2.3	+0.9
BNP	Tim Rait	825	1.5	+0.1
Green	Peter Forbes	482	0.9	N/A
Freedom and Responsibility	Peter Prior	270	0.5	N/A
Majority		16,769	31.3	+18.6
Turnout		53,720	73.7	+3.4
Conservative hold		Swing	+7.8	

=== Elections in the 2000s ===
General election 2005: Maidenhead
Party	Candidate	Votes	%	±%
Conservative	Theresa May	23,312	50.8	+5.8
Liberal Democrats	Kathryn Newbound	17,081	37.3	−0.1
Labour	Janet Pritchard	4,144	9.0	−6.2
BNP	Tim Rait	704	1.5	N/A
UKIP	Douglas Lewis	609	1.3	−0.4
Majority		6,231	13.5	+5.9
Turnout		45,850	71.7	+9.7
Conservative hold		Swing	+3.0	

General election 2001: Maidenhead
Party	Candidate	Votes	%	±%
Conservative	Theresa May	19,506	45.0	−4.8
Liberal Democrats	Kathryn Newbound	16,222	37.4	+11.1
Labour	John O'Farrell	6,577	15.2	−2.9
UKIP	Dennis Cooper	741	1.7	+1.2
Monster Raving Loony	Lloyd Clarke	272	0.6	N/A
Majority		3,284	7.6	−15.9
Turnout		43,318	62.0	−13.6
Conservative hold		Swing	−8.0	

=== Elections in the 1990s ===
General election 1997: Maidenhead
Party	Candidate	Votes	%	±%
Conservative	Theresa May	25,344	49.8	−11.8
Liberal Democrats	Andrew Ketteringham	13,363	26.3	−3.5
Labour	Denise Robson	9,205	18.1	+9.5
Referendum	Charles Taverner	1,638	3.2	N/A
Liberal	David Munkley	896	1.8	N/A
UKIP	Neil Spiers	277	0.5	N/A
Glow Bowling Party	Kristian Ardley	166	0.3	N/A
Majority		11,981	23.5	
Turnout		50,889	75.6	
Conservative win (new seat)				

== See also ==
- Parliamentary constituencies in Berkshire
- List of parliamentary constituencies in the South East England (region)

== Notes ==
Parliament of the United Kingdom
Preceded by Witney	Constituency represented by the prime minister 2016–2019	Succeeded by Uxbridge and South Ruislip
