= Bracknell =

Town and civil parish in Berkshire, England

Coordinates: 51.416°N 0.749°W

- Town and civil parish
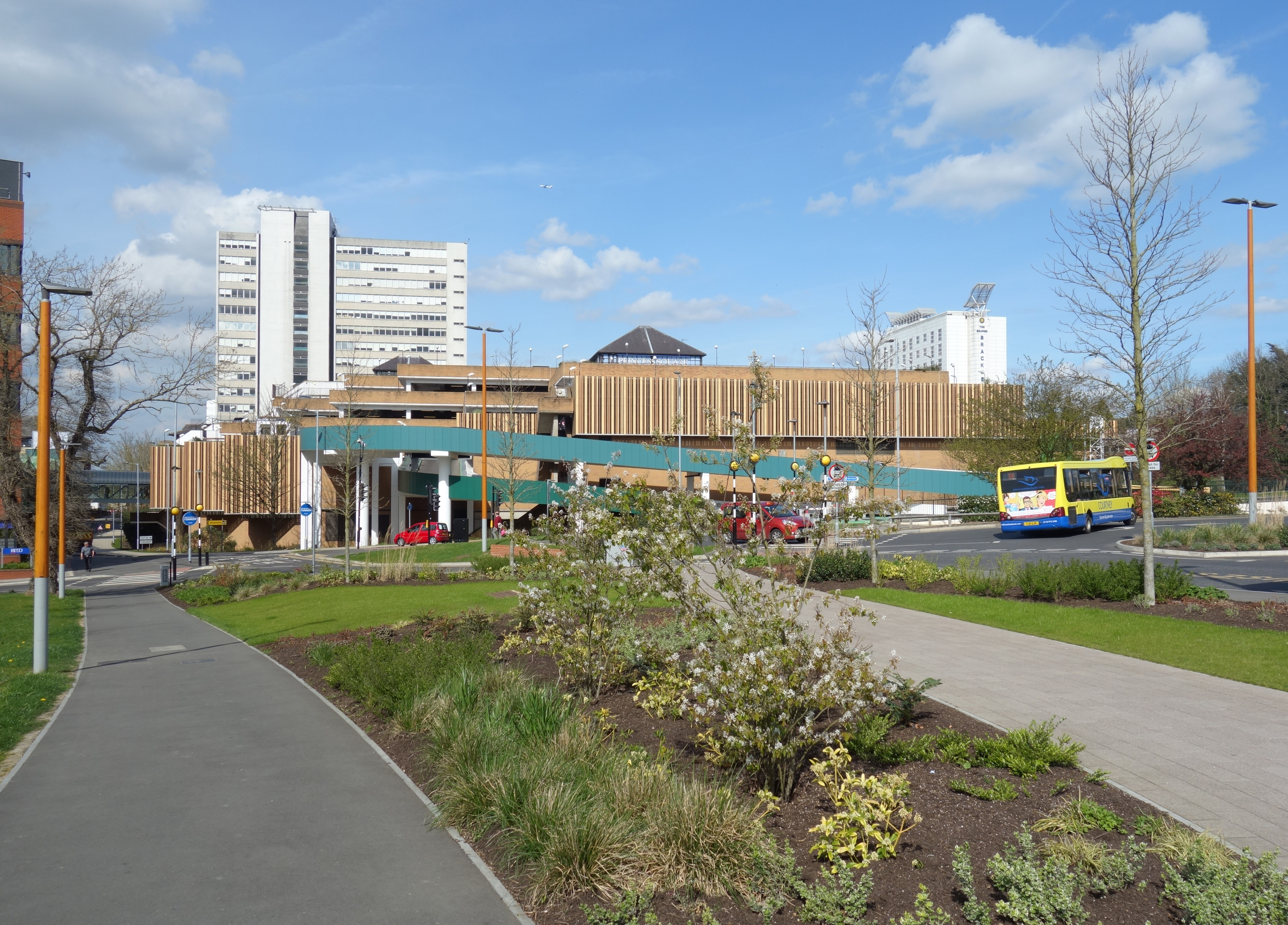
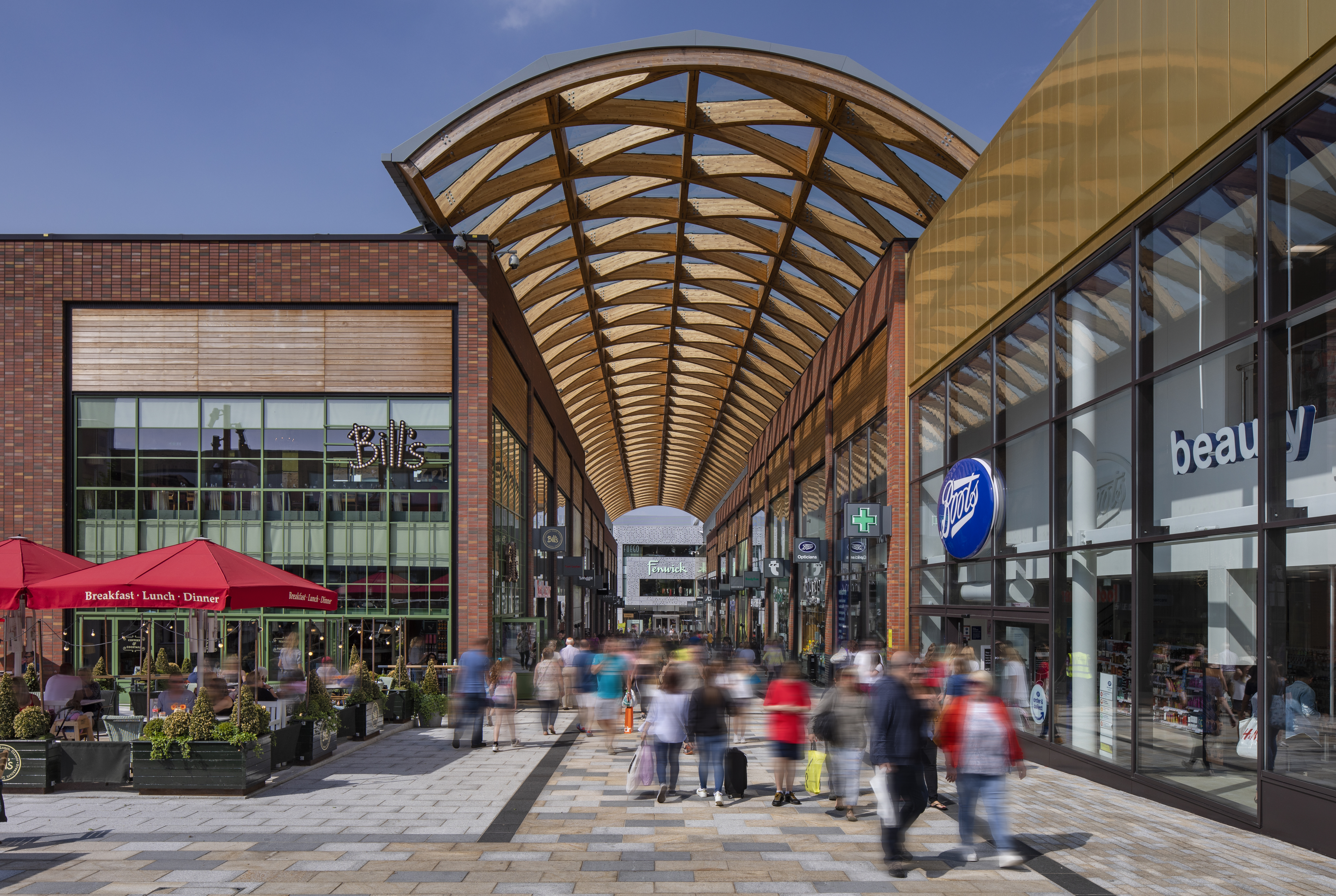
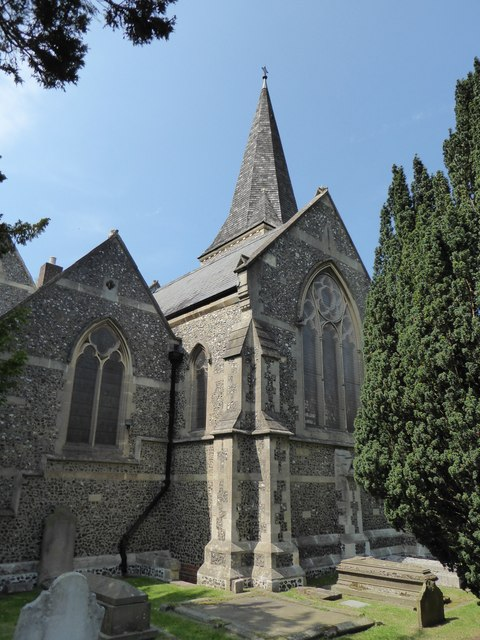
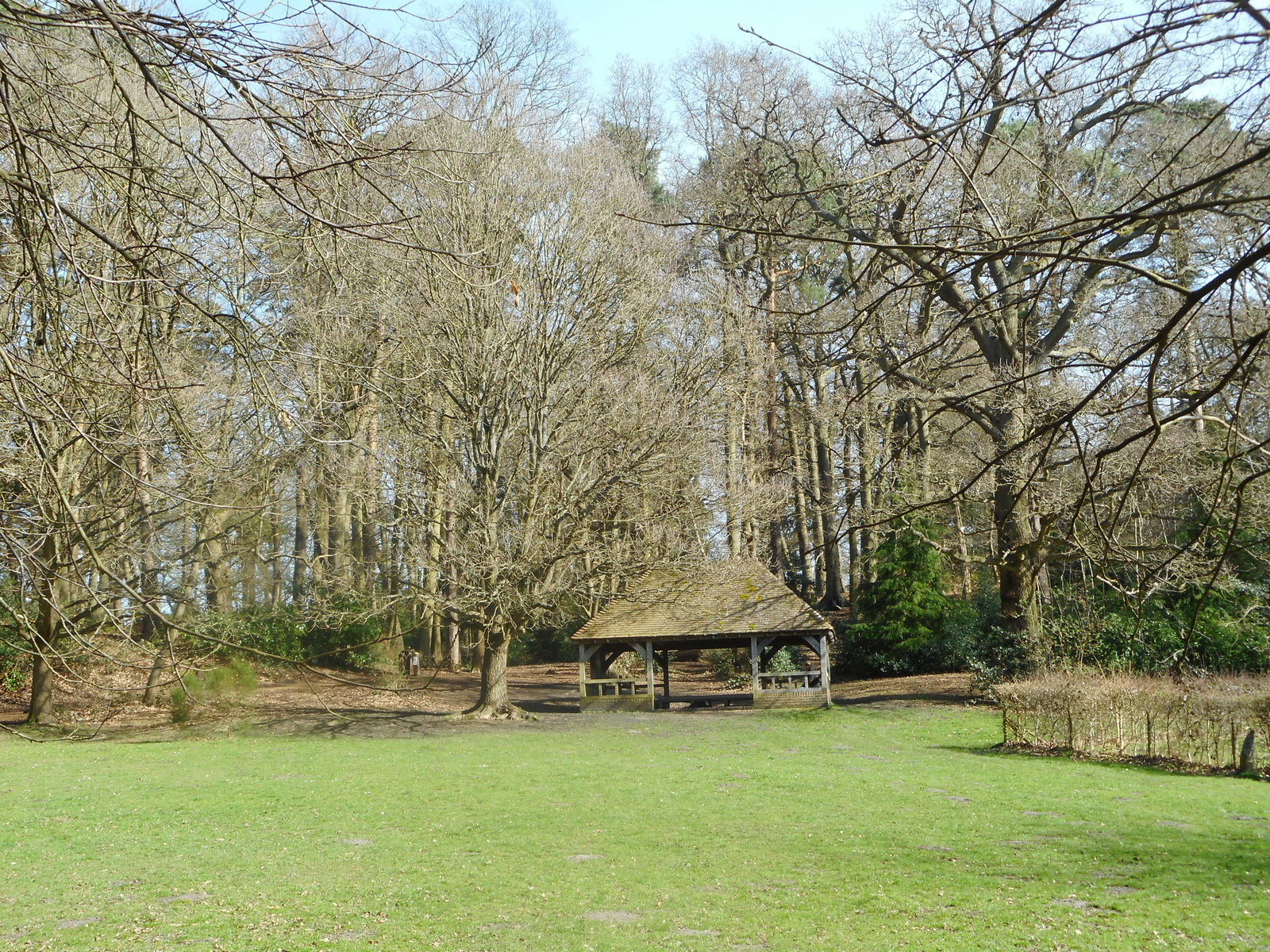
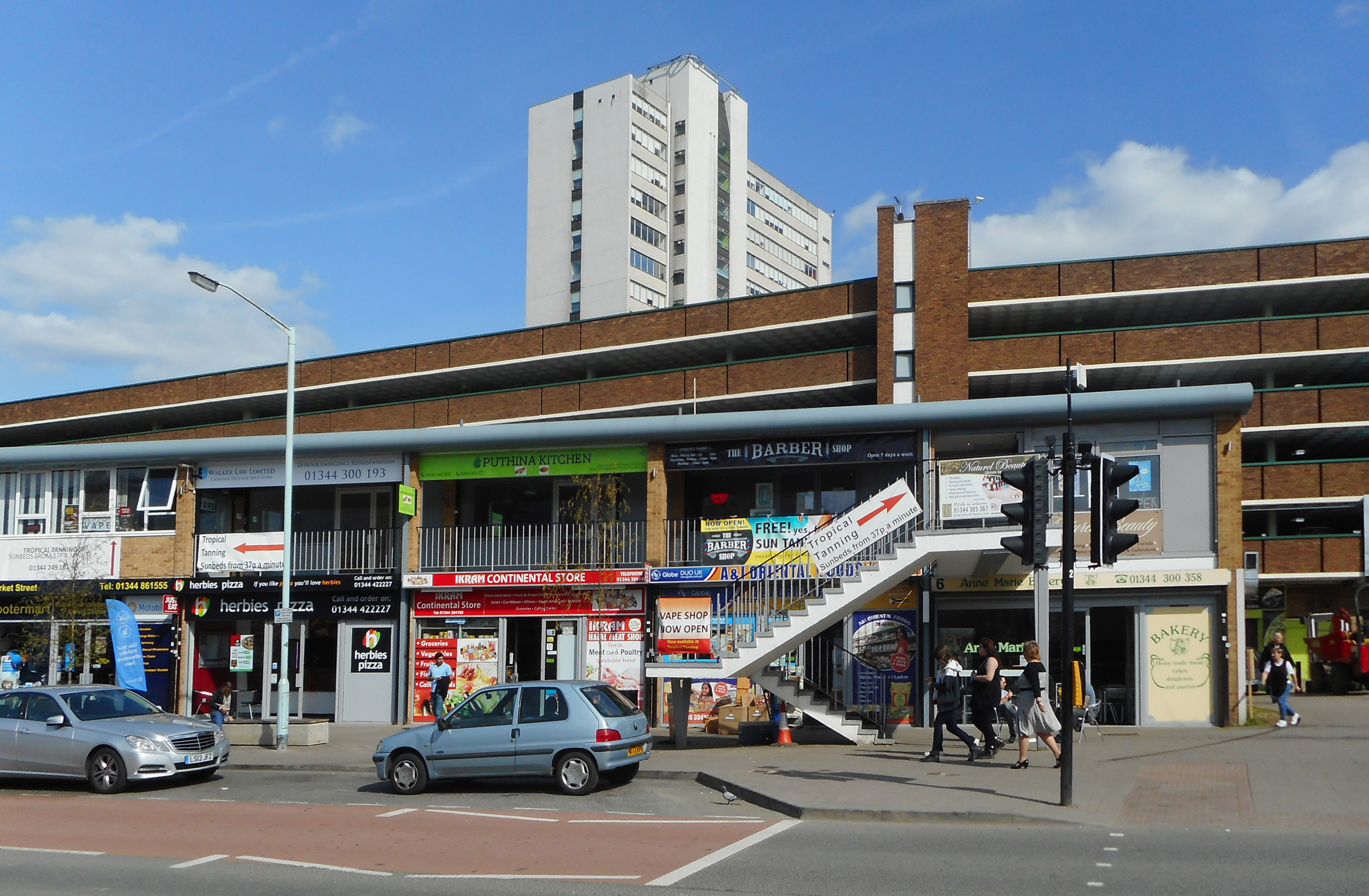
- Clockwise from top: Skyline of Bracknell, Holy Trinity Church, Market Street and shops, Lily Hill Park and the Lexicon

- Location within Berkshire
- Interactive map of Bracknell
- Population: 60,057 (2021 Census)
- OS grid reference: SU870693
- Civil parish: Bracknell
- Unitary authority: Bracknell Forest
- Shire county: Berkshire
- Region: South East
- Country: England
- Sovereign state: United Kingdom
- Areas of the town (2011 census BUASD): List: Amen Corner; Birch Hill; Bullbrook; Crown Wood; Easthampstead (Village); Farley Wood; Forest Park; Great Hollands; Hanworth; Harmans Water; Home Farm; Lawrence Hill; Martin's Heron; Popeswood (Village); Priestwood; Quelm Park; Temple Park; Warfield Park (Village); Whitegrove; Wild Ridings
- Post town: BRACKNELL
- Postcode district: RG12, RG42
- Dialling code: 01344
- Police: Thames Valley
- Fire: Royal Berkshire
- Ambulance: South Central
- UK Parliament: Bracknell

Bracknell (/ˈbræknəl/) is a town and civil parish in Berkshire, England, the westernmost area within the Greater London Urban Area and the administrative centre of the borough of Bracknell Forest. It lies 11 miles (18 km) to the east of Reading, 9 miles (14 km) south of Maidenhead, 10 miles (16 km) southwest of Windsor and 25 miles (40 km) west of central London. Bracknell is the third largest town in Berkshire.

The name Bracknell is derived from the Saxon Braccan Heal or Braccan Heale, first recorded in a charter boundary of 942 AD. In the Middle Ages, Bracknell developed into two small market villages, Old Bracknoll and New Bracknoll. By the 19th century, the two Bracknells had combined into a single market town, which was an important centre of local industry, most notably for its brick trade. In the 20th century, Bracknell experienced a period of rapid growth after it was declared a New Town. Planned at first for a population of 25,000, Bracknell New Town was further expanded in the 1960s to accommodate a population of 45,000. During this time, Bracknell absorbed many of its surrounding villages including Easthampstead, Ramslade and Old Bracknell. As of 2021, Bracknell Forest has an estimated population of around 113,205. Today, the town is a busy commercial centre within the so-called Silicon Thames Valley and the UK headquarters for several technology companies.

Bracknell is bordered to the south by Swinley Forest and by Crowthorne Woods to the south-east and south. Its neighbouring villages of Binfield, Warfield and Winkfield are part of the borough of Bracknell Forest and are gradually becoming absorbed into the Bracknell metropolitan area. To the east, the urban area joins up with Ascot to form a continuous conurbation that extends to Central London.

== History ==
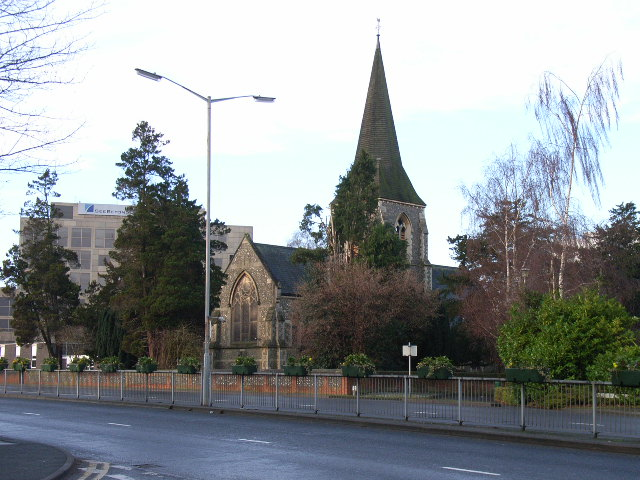
Holy Trinity Church, Bracknell

The name Bracknell is first recorded in a Winkfield Boundary Charter of AD 942 as both Braccan heal and Braccan heale. This was previously thought to mean "a nook of land belonging to a man called Bracca", from the Old English Braccan (genitive singular of a personal name) + heal, healh (a corner, nook or secret place), although recent academic evidence suggests it means simply "a hidden place where bracken grows." Bracknell was subsequently named on maps as Brakenhale (a name that still survives as the name of one of its schools), Brakehal and Brackenhal. The town today covers all of the old village of Easthampstead (though not all of the old parish) and the hamlet of Ramslade.

Evidence of human existence in Bracknell dates back to the end of the last ice age (c. 10,000BC), with abundant flint tools found in nearby Amen Corner. There is a Bronze Age round barrow at Bill Hill. Easthampstead Park was a favoured royal hunting lodge in Windsor Forest and Catherine of Aragon was banished there until her divorce was finalised. It was later the home of the Trumbulls who were patrons of Alexander Pope from Binfield.

To the north-east of the town, in the suburb of Quelm Park, is the Quelm Stone, a standing stone, and to the south-west, just over the border in Crowthorne, is Caesar's Camp, an Iron Age hill fort.

One of the oldest buildings in the town is the Old Manor public house, a 17th-century brick manor house featuring a number of priest holes. Other surviving old pubs are the Red Lion and the Bull, both timber-framed and dating from before the 18th century.

The oldest place of worship in the town is the parish church of St Michael and St Mary Magdalene's Church, Easthampstead. There has been a church there since Saxon times, although the present building dates from the mid 19th century, except for the lower portions of the Tudor tower. Holy Trinity Church near the town centre was built in 1851.

=== New town ===
Bracknell was designated a new town on 17 June 1949, in the aftermath of the Second World War. The site was originally a small market town in the civil parish of Warfield in the Easthampstead Rural District. Very little of the original Bracknell is left. The location was preferred to White Waltham, which was also considered, because the Bracknell site avoided encroaching on good quality agricultural land. It had the additional advantage of being on a railway line.

The new town was planned for 25,000 people; it was intended to occupy over 1,000 hectares (2,500 acres) of land in and around 'Old Bracknell', in the area now occupied by Priestwood, Easthampstead, Bullbrook and Harmans Water. The existing town centre and industrial areas were to be retained with new industry brought in to provide jobs. The town has since expanded far beyond its intended size into farmland to the south.

The New Town was planned on the neighbourhood principle, with a series of neighbourhoods each with a population of around 10,000 with (no more than around five minutes walk away) a church, a small parade of shops, a primary school, small business space, a community centre and a pub. The plans included pedestrianisation, the construction of a ring road around the town centre, and segregation of industrial areas from residential areas.

A feature of some of the estates is that streets only have names, not odonyms – in Birch Hill, Crown Wood, Great Hollands and others there is no Road, Avenue, Street, just 'Frobisher', 'Jameston', 'Juniper', 'Jevington'. The residential streets are, however, named in alphabetical order in Great Hollands and Wildridings, with As to Ds, such as Donnybrook, in Hanworth, Js, such as 'Jameston', 'Juniper' and 'Jevington' in Birch Hill.

Bracknell Development Corporation commissioned a history of the New Town, published in 1981, entitled Bracknell: The making of our New Town, by Henry and Judith Parris.

== Regeneration ==
Because of Bracknell's age, it was decided in 1995 by the local authorities that it should undergo renovation. Designs and plans were submitted and rejected first time round. The council went for a second attempt and were accepted, work was due to commence early in 2008 but due to the global credit crisis, the plans were postponed. The cost was estimated at £750 million. The regeneration would provide brand new services, a completely redeveloped town centre, 1,000 new homes and new police and bus stations.

The first stage of the redevelopment began with the opening of a new Waitrose store in December 2011. By June 2013 shops in the northern part of the town in Broadway and Crossway had been vacated. Demolition of the new town's old retro-futuristic, Brutalist central area then began in September 2013, and was completed in December of the same year. Construction of the new centre began in February 2015. On 4 September 2015, it was announced that the new development would be known as The Lexicon. The Lexicon opened on 7 September 2017, comprising 600,000 ft^{2} (56,000 m^{2}) of new retail space, a 12-screen cinema which includes a 4DX screen, restaurants and cafes, completely new paving and public realm and 1300 parking spaces as well as improved access by public transport, the council having substantially refurbished the bus station in 2015.

The scheme won at the Revo Awards 2018: Gold in the Re:new category and Best of the Best in the Re:turn category. Shortlisted for the Planning Awards 2017 in the Regeneration category, the scheme won Development of the Year at the 2018 Thames Valley Property Awards. The town saw visitor numbers of 16m in its first year (compared with around 4-5m prior to the town centre's demolition). The town centre rose in the retail rankings to number 33 (from 255 before redevelopment). In January 2019, the town had risen again to 29 in the retail rankings.

A second retail centre, the Peel Centre, managed by Land Securities, has 2 car parks and includes stores Such as The Range, Home Bargains, Pets At Home, Halfords and Morrisons. It previously contained a leisure area called The Point. The Point included an Odeon multiplex 10-screen cinema, a Pizza Hut restaurant and a bowling alley prior to their closures in 2025, with the bowling alley being last to close in late 2025.

Bracknell is the first post-war New Town centre to have been substantially regenerated and represents a significant exemplar development.

== Demography ==
According to the Office for National Statistics, in 2018 there were 121,676 people in Bracknell Forest.

According to the 2011 Census.

94% of Bracknell residents can speak English. The second language being Nepalese, at 0.90%, followed by Polish at 0.70%, Tagalog/Filipino at 0.30% and French and Spanish, both at 0.30%.

61% of residents identify themselves as Christian. The second most common belief is 'none', with 35% of residents choosing this in the census, in third place is Hinduism at 1.61%, followed by Islam at 1.13% and Buddhism at 0.73%.

The demonym for a person from Bracknell is Bracknellian.

== Business ==
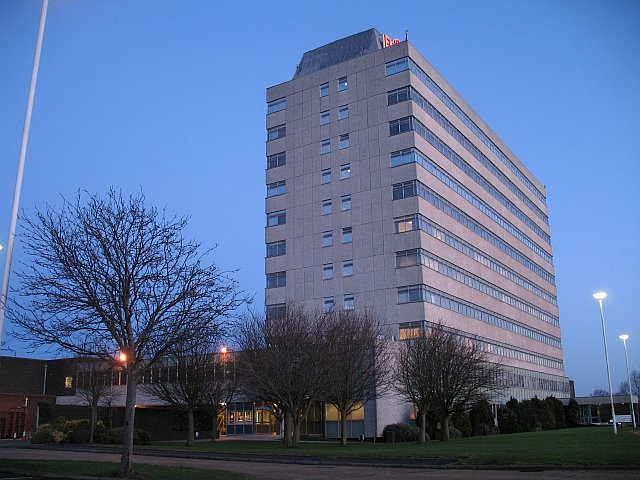
Fujitsu's European HQ

The town is home to companies such as 3M, Panasonic, Egnyte, Fujitsu (formerly ICL), Dell, HP Inc., Hewlett Packard Enterprise, Micron Technology, Brocade Communications Systems, Siemens (originally Nixdorf), Riverbed, Honeywell, Intercall, Broadcom, Avnet Technology Solutions, Bird Technologies, Novell, and Honda.

The Southern Industrial Area houses the head office of Waitrose. The 70-acre (280,000 m^{2}) site houses the central distribution centre. Waitrose has operated from the town since the 1970s with its old store based at Birch Hill Shopping Centre until closure with a new store opened in the town centre in 2011.

Manufacturing industry has largely disappeared since the 1980s. Former significant sites included Racal Communications in Western and London Road, Clifford's Dairy in Downshire Way and British Aerospace (originally Sperry Gyroscope) now occupied by Arlington Square, a 22-acre (8.9-hectare) business park of which the first stage was completed in 1995. The Thomas Lawrence brickworks on the north side of the town was famous for 'red rubber' bricks to be found in the Royal Albert Hall and Westminster Cathedral, and in restoration work at 10 Downing Street and Hampton Court Palace.

In the town centre was the 12-storey Winchester House, formerly owned by 3M who moved to new premises in Farley Wood on the town's northern edge in 2004. The building was demolished and has been replaced with a large block of flats The town was also the home of Racal and Ferranti Computer Systems Ltd. The Met Office maintained a large presence in the town until 2003, when it relocated to Exeter in Devon; however, the junction of the A329 and A3095 is still named the "Met Office Roundabout". Many businesses are located on the town's three industrial areas.

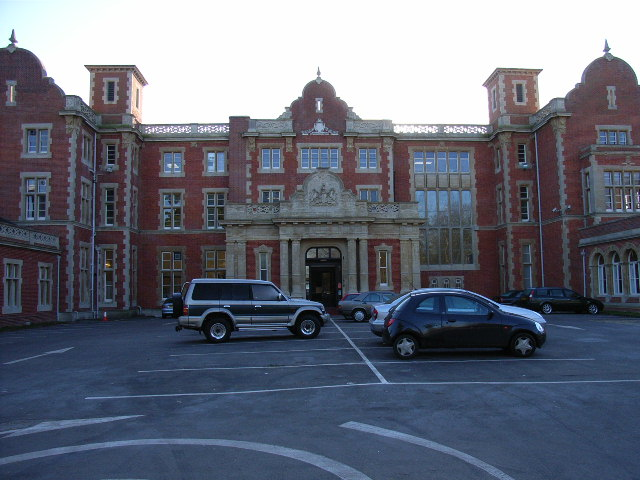
Easthampstead Park Conference Centre

Easthampstead Park in the southern suburb of Easthampstead was a conference centre owned by Bracknell Forest Borough Council. In 2019 an agreement was made between the local authority and a hotel group, Active Hospitality. The building is now leased to the company and has reopened as a hotel

== Local government ==
Bracknell was made a civil parish in its own right in 1955, forming Bracknell Parish Council, later renamed Bracknell Town Council. Under the Local Government Act 1972, the entire Easthampstead Rural District became the Bracknell District on 1 April 1974. In 1988, it was granted borough status, and it changed its name to Bracknell Forest. When Berkshire County Council was abolished on 1 April 1998 (and the non-metropolitan county was reclassified as a ceremonial county), Bracknell Forest became one of the six unitary authorities which together make up Berkshire. Bracknell Forest Borough Council's offices are at Time Square in Market Street.

== Geography ==
The town covers areas previously in the parishes of Easthampstead, Warfield, Binfield and Winkfield. The town's centre lies just north of the railway station with completely pedestrianised and much undercover shopping around Princess Square, Charles Square and the Broadway. There are 'out-of-town' shops, a multiscreen cinema and ten pin bowling complex at the Peel Centre. Just to the west are the Western and Southern industrial estates, either side of the railway line. There are many residential suburbs (see settlement table below) of varying dates, the oldest being Priestwood and, of course, Easthampstead village.

The former RAF Staff College buildings in Harmans Water, now closed, was part of the Joint Services Command and Staff College. From 2008, the site was redeveloped for housing by Wimpey, with an estimated 730 houses. The south-western corner of the town remains rural around Easthampstead Park and the wooded Yew Tree Corner. A newer housing development called Jennett's Park was built (from 2007) at Peacock Farm and on part of what was historically the grounds of Easthampstead Park. There are large ponds at Farley Wood and the Easthampstead Mill Pond between Great Hollands and Wildridings, and two lakes at South Hill Park. The Bull Brook emerges above ground just within the bounds of the suburb of Bullbrook.

== Culture ==
South Hill Park lies in Bracknell and houses an arts centre

In the south of the town is South Hill Park, a mansion dating from 1760, although much rebuilt, that now houses a large arts centre. The Wilde Theatre was opened in 1984, named after Oscar Wilde who created the character 'Lady Bracknell' in his play The Importance of Being Earnest, which was also the inaugural production at the theatre in April of that year. South Hill Park has been home to a number of major music festivals over the years:

- 1975 – 1990s Bracknell Jazz Festival
- 1970s – 1980s Bracknell Folk Festival ("The Handsome Mouldiwarp Festival")
- 1988 – Womad Festival
- 1980s – 1990s – Bracknell Music Festival / South Hill Park Festival
- 2000s – 2013 – Big Day Out festival, a free, annual World Music and acoustic/folk festival

Bracknell does have an active music scene, with choirs such as Bracknell Choral Society, bands such as the Supertonics Big Band, and the Berkshire Music Trust, a music education charity.

Bracknell has been used in the filming of many TV shows and films, such as Harry Potter and the Philosopher's Stone (Martins Heron) and Time Bandits (Birch Hill). Bracknell is given the name 'Laxton' in the TV detective series Pie in the Sky and Waterside Park was used for the exterior of the police HQ in the same series. Bracknell has also featured in the 1991 Roger Daltrey film Buddy's Song.

The Offence (1972), a psychological thriller with Sean Connery and Ian Bannen, was filmed in Bracknell. There are scenes in the town centre, on Broadway, Charles Square and Market Street. The flat for Connery's character was filmed at the listed Point Royal, and the bulk of the outdoor scenes were taken around Wildridings, specifically Arncliffe, Crossfell, Mill Pond and Mill Lane.

The wages snatch scene in Villain (1971), a gangster film with Richard Burton, was filmed in Ellesfield Avenue on the Southern Industrial Estate outside the former Clark Eaton glass factory, with the ICL tower block visible in the background; after the robbery the gang make their getaway along Peacock Lane nearby and hijack a car at the junction with the footpath from Tarmans Copse (now Osprey Avenue on the Jennett's Park estate).

Bracknell is featured in the PlayStation 3 video game Resistance: Fall of Man set in 1951, as the location at which power conduits travel deep underground South East England to power the Chimeran fortresses. It also featured in the sequel Resistance 2 in a similar role.

The BBC show The Wrong Mans is set almost entirely in Bracknell.

Tracy Beaker actress Dani Harmer was brought up in Bracknell.

During the 1960s, author J. M. Coetzee lived in the town and worked for an IT company.

Artist Kerry Lemon was commissioned to create a number of site-specific artworks for the Lexicon town centre development. Her work includes a series of 36 unique botanical paving slabs in granite and brass designed to create a nature trail through the town centre; 15 gobo lights projecting moth drawings in light onto the pavements below; 5 cast jesmonite birch leaf benches with hand sculpted solid brass insects and painted brass leaf veins.

=== Twinning ===
Bracknell is twinned with Leverkusen in Germany, an arrangement which has existed since 1973. It was originally twinned with Opladen, which was incorporated into Leverkusen in a 1975 local government reorganisation. Each town has a square named after the other. Leverkusen is home to a Bracknell-themed pub called 'Bracknellstube'.

=== Media ===
Local news and television programmes are provided by BBC South & ITV Meridian from Hannington and BBC London and ITV London from Crystal Palace. The town's local radio stations are BBC Radio Berkshire, Heart South and Greatest Hits Radio South. Local newspapers that cover Bracknell are Reading Chronicle, and Bracknell News.

== Transport ==
=== Rail ===
The town of Bracknell has two railway stations, Bracknell and Martins Heron, both of which are on the Waterloo to Reading Line, built by the London and South Western Railway and now operated by South Western Railway. Bracknell is a commuter centre with its residents travelling in both directions (westwards to Reading and eastwards to London Waterloo).

=== Road ===
The town has good road links and is situated at the end of the A329(M) motorway, midway between Junction 3 of the M3 and Junction 10 of the M4 motorways. A proposed motorway link between the M3 and the M4 to be called the M31 would have passed to the west of the town centre, but only the section that is now the A329(M) and the A3290 was built.

=== Bus ===
Bracknell bus station serves the town of Bracknell. The bus station is on The Ring in the Town Centre across the road from Bracknell railway station. The bus station consists of three long shelters each with three stands.

Bus services go from Bracknell as far afield as Crowthorne, Camberley, Wokingham, Reading, Maidenhead, Windsor and Slough. Local bus services are provided by Thames Valley Buses and Reading Buses, who also provide the Green Line services to London Victoria and Heathrow Airport.

=== Air ===
Heathrow Airport is 13 miles (21 kilometres) east of Bracknell. Green Line operates a bus from Heathrow Airport to Bracknell. Courtney Buses also services this route. Blackbushe Airport in Yateley is the nearest general aviation airport located 15 miles (24 kilometres) southwest of Bracknell.

== Sport and leisure ==
Bracknell Town F.C. are members of the Southern Football League Premier Division South, and play their home matches at Bottom Meadow, Sandhurst. The Bracknell Bees Ice Hockey Club are former national champions, who currently play in the NIHL National League. The Bracknell Blazers were the 2009 BBF National League champions. The town is also represented by teams playing rugby, Bracknell RFC; hockey, South Berkshire Hockey Club; cricket, Bracknell Cricket Club; and baseball/softball, Bracknell Baseball/Softball Club.

The town has a large leisure centre, the Bracknell Leisure Centre, and the Coral Reef Waterworld. A golf course, the Downshire Golf Complex. Two tennis Clubs, the Bracknell Lawn Tennis Club and Esporta, the Royal County of Berkshire Club. There are 2,600 acres (1,100 hectares) of Crown Estate woodland at the Look Out Discovery Centre.

A number of organisations are active in the area. These consist of an Army Cadet Force detachment (7 Platoon Bracknell) and the Air Training Corps (2211 Squadron), Saint John Ambulance Cadets and the Bracknell Forest Lions Club, which was formed in 1968 to help those in need.

== Education ==
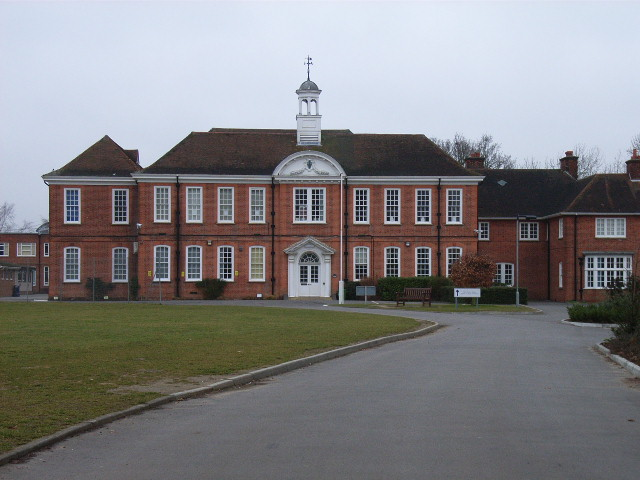
Ranelagh Church of England School

The area has various schools including St Joseph's Catholic Primary School, The Brakenhale School, Garth Hill College, King's Academy Easthampstead Park and Ranelagh Church of England School. Bracknell and Wokingham College of further education is also based in the area.

The Silwood Park campus of Imperial College London is five miles (eight kilometres) east of Bracknell town centre. The University of Reading is 8 mi (13 km) northwest, and Royal Holloway College is 8 mi (13 km) east.

== Notable people ==
- Philippa "Phily" Bowden – long distance runner
- Dani Harmer – actress and television personality who starred in The Story of Tracy Beaker
- John Nike – English businessman and Bracknell-based leisure and hotel entrepreneur
- Claudie Blakley – English Actress - Born in Easthampstead
