= List of local nature reserves in Berkshire =

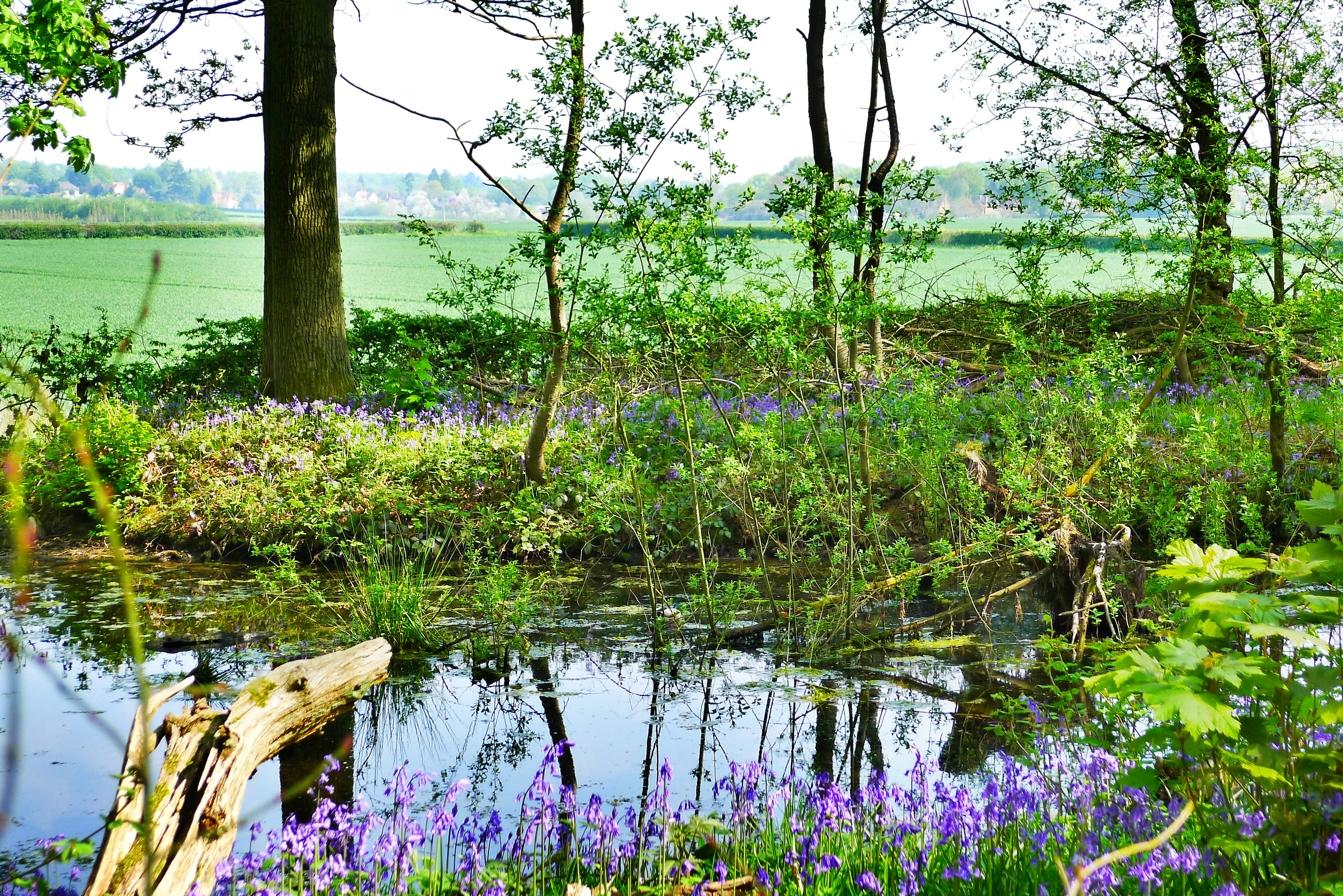
Bluebells in Goulding's Wood, part of Park Wood and Goulding's Wood LNR

Local nature reserves (LNRs) in England are designated by local authorities under Section 21 of the National Parks and Access to the Countryside Act 1949. LNRs are sites which have a special local interest either biologically or geologically. Local authorities have a duty to care for them, and must control the sites by owning or leasing them, or by having an agreement with the owners. The local authorities can apply local byelaws to manage and protect LNRs.

As of January 2020, there are forty-one LNRs in Berkshire. Five are also Sites of Special Scientific Interest, two are Special Areas of Conservation and four are managed by the Berkshire, Buckinghamshire and Oxfordshire Wildlife Trust.

Berkshire is a county in South East England. It is bordered by Hampshire and Surrey to the south, Greater London to the east, Wiltshire to the west and Buckinghamshire and Oxfordshire to the north. Berkshire lies in the valleys of the Thames and its tributary, the River Kennet, and in the west it is crossed by chalk hills. It has a population of more than 860,000. It is no longer an administrative county following the abolition of Berkshire County Council in 1998. It is governed by six unitary authorities: Bracknell Forest, Reading, Slough, West Berkshire, Windsor and Maidenhead and Wokingham.

== Key ==
=== Other designations and wildlife trust management ===
- BBOWT = Berkshire, Buckinghamshire and Oxfordshire Wildlife Trust
- SAC = Special Area of Conservation
- SSSI = Site of Special Scientific Interest

== Sites ==
Site	Photograph	Area (Note: The area is taken from the Natural England map of each site. (Click on the identify icon (i) in the "Feature Tools" and then click on the site.))	Location (Note: The location is taken from the Natural England details page for the site.)	Borough	Other	Map (Note: The maps are on the Natural England database of local nature reserves.) and details (Note: Details are on the pages on each site in the Natural England database of local nature reserves.)	Description
Alder Moors	Alder Moors	8.5 hectares (21 acres)	Woodley; 51.459°N 0.886°W; SU 775 739	Wokingham		Map and details	This ancient wood is named after the alder trees which dominate it. Other species include ash and willow. Ground flora include marsh marigolds, primroses and anemones.
Ali's Pond	Ali's Pond	0.4 hectares (0.99 acres)	Sonning; 51.470°N 0.913°W; SU 756 751	Wokingham		Map and details	More than 40 aquatic and wetland plants and 18 species of dragonfly have been recorded at the reserve. Other fauna include great crested newts, harvest mice, stag beetles, song thrushes and pipistrelle bats.
Ambarrow Court	Ambarrow Court	7.8 hectares (19 acres)	Sandhurst; 51.356°N 0.817°W; SU 825 625	Bracknell Forest		Map and details	This site, which was once part of a Victorian country estate, has ancient woodland, birch and hazel coppice, marsh, ponds and a meadow. Fauna include noctule bats, glow worms and stag beetles.
Arthur Jacob Nature Reserve	Arthur Jacob Nature Reserve	4.1 hectares (10 acres)	Horton; 51.472°N 0.530°W; TQ 022 758	Windsor and Maidenhead		Map and details	The reserve has four former gravel pits which have been converted from derelict land into lagoons managed for wildlife. There are several islands and the site has been planted with trees and shrubs, while some areas have been turned into wildflower meadows.
Bisham Woods	Bisham Woods	85.7 hectares (212 acres)	Cookham; 51.556°N 0.765°W; SU 857 849	Windsor and Maidenhead	SAC, SSSI	Map and details	Most of this site is broad leaved woodland on well drained chalk soils, together with some areas on wet clay and others on glacial sands and gravels. It has one of the richest ground floras of any wood in the county, with dog's mercury and ivy dominant. There are also mollusc species characteristic of ancient woodland on chalky soils, such as the snails Helicigona lapicida, Pomatias elegans and Cochlodina laminata.
Blundells Copse	Blundells Copse	5.6 hectares (14 acres)	Reading; 51.456°N 1.033°W; SU 673 734	Reading		Map and details	A stream runs through this area of ancient woodland. There are fauna such as bats, hedgehogs, muntjac deer, field mice and frogs, while flora include opposite leaved golden saxifrage, marsh marigold, yellow archangel and fool's-water-cress.
Bradnam Wood	Bradnam Wood	12.5 hectares (31 acres)	Maidenhead; 51.549°N 0.780°W; SU 847 840	Windsor and Maidenhead		Map and details	This site has mature woodland at the northern end and more recently planted trees in the south. In the middle is a field which has chalk grassland plants and large anthills.
Braywick Park	Braywick Park	12.7 hectares (31 acres)	Maidenhead; 51.512°N 0.710°W; SU 896 800	Windsor and Maidenhead		Map and details	This former quarry has areas of parkland together with areas managed for wildlife with grassland, woodland a pond.
Carpenter's Wood	Carpenter's Wood	21.4 hectares (53 acres)	Maidenhead; 51.537°N 0.785°W; SU 844 827	Windsor and Maidenhead		Map and details	The site consists of two adjacent woods, Carpenter's Wood and Dungrovehill Wood. It lost half of its mature beech trees in the storms of 1987 and the early 1990s.
Clayfield Copse	Clayfield Copse	8.7 hectares (21 acres)	Caversham; 51.488°N 0.957°W; SU 725 771	Reading		Map and details	This site has mature woodland, fields managed as recreational areas, other fields left to regenerate as woodland, a wildlflower meadow and a sculpture trail. There are also ancient ditches and boundary banks. The woodland has a wild pear and wild service tree.
Cocksherd Wood	Cocksherd Wood	4.8 hectares (12 acres)	Slough; 51.536°N 0.639°W; SU 945 828	Slough		Map and details	This ancient wood has diverse fauna and flora, including field maple, wild cherry, birch, oak, hazel, beech, honeysuckle and blackthorn. There is a display of bluebells in April.
Edgbarrow Woods	Edgbarrow Woods	36.8 hectares (91 acres)	Crowthorne; 51.358°N 0.805°W; SU 833 628	Bracknell Forest		Map and details	This reserve has semi-natural woodland, wet and dry heath and acidic grassland. Fauna include noctule bats, glow-worms, silver-studded blue butterflies, and such birds such as Eurasian hobby, Eurasian bullfinches and Dartford warblers.
Englemere Pond	Englemere Pond	26.4 hectares (65 acres)	Ascot; 51.408°N 0.702°W; SU 904 685	Bracknell Forest	SSSI	Map and details	This large pond is surrounded by marshland. It is dominated by common reed, and other flora include bog mosses, sundew, bog pondweed, spike-rush and St John's-wort. The swamp also provides a habitat for a variety of breeding birds, such as sedge warblers and common reed bunting. There are areas of woodland a small heath.
Farley Copse	Farley Copse	33 hectares (82 acres)	Bracknell; 51.419°N 0.780°W; SU 849 696	Bracknell Forest		Map and details	This area of ancient woodland has flora such as wood anemones and dog violets. It has a pond with large red damselfies and broad-bodied chaser dragonflies.
The Gullet	The Gullet	2.1 hectares (5.2 acres)	Maidenhead; 51.516°N 0.733°W; SU 880 804	Windsor and Maidenhead		Map and details	This is a strip of woodland next to the railway in Maidenhead. It has a variety of species of trees and flowering plants, and there are also areas of scrub and rough grassland.
Hayley Green Wood	Hayley Green Wood	2.0 hectares (4.9 acres)	Warfield; 51.429°N 0.723°W; SU 889 708	Bracknell Forest		Map and details	This wood on London clay has ash, silver birch and willow trees. Fauna include grass snakes and frogs, and flora include ox-eye daisy, self heal and foxgloves.
Haymill Valley	Haymill Valley	7.8 hectares (19 acres)	Slough; 51.526°N 0.644°W; SU 942 817	Slough	BBOWT	Map and details	This nature reserve has woodland with bluebells and great spotted woodpeckers, together with reedbeds which have flora including yellow iris and marsh-marigold. There are butterflies such as orange-tips, holly blues and speckled woods.
Heathlake	Heath Lake	22.3 hectares (55 acres)	Crowthorne; 51.380°N 0.810°W; SU 829 652	Wokingham	SSSI	Map and details	Most of this 2.8-hectare (7-acre) lake is less than 1 metre (3 feet) deep. It is the only acid lake in the county which retains its characteristic plants, such as alternate water-milfoil and six-stamened waterwort. The banks are peaty and marshy in some areas. There are also small areas of woodland, dry heath and acid grassland.
Herschel Park	Herschel Park	4.2 hectares (10 acres)	Slough; 51.502°N 0.594°W; SU 977 790	Slough		Map and details	The park, which has flowers, mammals and birds, provides a good view of Windsor Castle.
Highwood	Highwood	15.2 hectares (38 acres)	Woodley; 51.447°N 0.922°W; SU 750 725	Wokingham		Map and details	This site was formerly part of the grounds of Woodley Lodge, and its former arboretum has exotic trees such as giant redwoods and monkey puzzles. Birds include common kingfishers, goosanders, common shag, grey wagtails, Bohemian waxwings and great spotted woodpeckers.
Holt Copse & Joel Park	Holt Copse	5.3 hectares (13 acres)	Wokingham; 51.417°N 0.845°W; SU 804 693	Wokingham		Map and details	Most of this site is woodland, some of it ancient semi-natural and some mixed deciduous. There is a large noctule bat roost.
Hosehill Lake	Hosehill Lake	23.6 hectares (58 acres)	Theale; 51.422°N 1.069°W; SU 649 696	West Berkshire	BBOWT	Map and details	The lake has a wide variety of water birds, including northern lapwings, little ringed plovers and great crested grebes. A wildflower meadow with many butterflies and moths is grazed by wild Exmoor ponies.
Jock's Copse	Jock's Copse	1.5 hectares (3.7 acres)	Binfield; 51.425°N 0.770°W; SU 856 703	Bracknell Forest		Map and details	This is ancient coppiced wood mainly of oak and hazel with several wild service trees. Fauna include badgers, roe deer, Eurasian bullfinches and all three British species of woodpecker.
Lavells Lake	Lavells Lake	12.5 hectares (31 acres)	Woodley; 51.450°N 0.875°W; SU 783 729	Wokingham		Map and details	The site is part of Dinton Pastures Country Park, which was previously used for gravel extraction and now has eight lakes. The LNR is centred on one of the lakes and is managed to encourage its bird population. There are also islands and meadows.
Longmoor Bog	Longmoor Bog	11.8 hectares (29 acres)	Finchampstead; 51.381°N 0.879°W; SU 781 653	Wokingham	SSSI	Map and details	This is mainly carr woodland, together with areas of wet heath and secondary mixed woodland. A small stream runs through the carr woodland, which has peat to a depth of more than a metre covered by mosses. The wet heath is important for insects, such as the bog bush cricket, silver-studded blue butterfly, emperor dragonfly, waved black moth and wood ant.
Lousehill Copse	Lousehill Copse	13.0 hectares (32 acres)	Tilehurst; 51.455°N 1.021°W; SU 681 733	Reading		Map and details	This site is in the middle of housing. It is mainly semi-ancient oak and hazel woodland on sand gravel. There is also a meadow, an old pond and marshy areas.
Maiden Erlegh Lakes	Maiden Erlegh Lakes	10.2 hectares (25 acres)	Earley; 51.433°N 0.924°W; SU 749 710	Wokingham		Map and details	This site has lakes, ancient semi-natural woodland deciduous woodland. Features include a tern nesting platform and a sculpture called The Duck and the World. Fishing is allowed in the lake.
The Marshes	The Marshes	2.2 hectares (5.4 acres)	Swallowfield; 51.364°N 0.947°W; SU 734 633	Wokingham		Map and details	The main part of this site is a former horse paddock which was planted with 1400 native shrubs and trees between 2004 and 2008. A pond and boardwalk were constructed in a small area of wet woodland.
McIlroy Park	McIlroy Park	12.0 hectares (30 acres)	Reading; 51.464°N 1.027°W; SU 677 743	Reading		Map and details	The park has views over the River Thames, and a sunken ancient track called Gypsy Lane, which is lined with beech trees. Most of it is grassland broom, but there also areas of semi-ancient woodland, one of which has disused chalk quarries.
Ockwells Park	Ockwells Park	9.3 hectares (23 acres)	Maidenhead; 51.499°N 0.734°W; SU 880 786	Windsor and Maidenhead		Map and details	The LNR is the nature reserve part of a larger park. It has paths and a nature trail through areas of woodland, meadow and copses.
Padworth Common	Padworth Common	28.0 hectares (69 acres)	Burghfield Common; 51.377°N 1.112°W; SU 619 646	West Berkshire	BBOWT	Map and details	This site is mainly heath, but there are also areas of grassland, wet gullies, ponds and oak and pine woodland. There is a variety of heathland birds, such as Dartford warbler, tree pipit, European stonechat, woodlark and the rare European nightjar. The pond has many dragonflies and damselflies.
Park Wood and Goulding's Wood	ark Wood and Goulding's Wood	35.3 hectares (87 acres)	Maidenhead; 51.546°N 0.770°W; SU 854 837	Windsor and Maidenhead		Map and details	This mature wood is mainly oak and beech on clay soils. There are several sequoia trees which were planted in the Victorian period. There are ponds and dells in the north of the site, which is dominated by rhododendrons.
Pearman's Copse	Pearman's Copse	6.9 hectares (17 acres)	Lower Earley; 51.418°N 0.944°W; SU 735 693	Wokingham		Map and details	This is an ancient wood with ash, hazel and oak trees. It has archaeological features such as boundary banks and ditches.
Piggy Wood	Piggy Wood	2.3 hectares (5.7 acres)	Warfield; 51.428°N 0.749°W; SU 871 706	Bracknell Forest		Map and details	In the summer damselflies and dragonflies can be seen along a tributary of The Cut, which runs through the wood. Flora include wood anemone, marsh marigold and wood avens.
Round Copse	Round Copse	1.7 hectares (4.2 acres)	Reading; 51.461°N 1.025°W; SU 678 740	Reading		Map and details	This dense wood has diverse birds, including all three British species of woodpecker, Eurasian nuthatches, Eurasian treecreepers, thrushes, and blackbirds.
Sutherland Grange	Sutherland Grange	3.2 hectares (7.9 acres)	Windsor; 51.485°N 0.649°W; SU 939 771	Windsor and Maidenhead		Map and details	Part of this open space is a conservation area. A field called Sutherland Grange Hay Meadow has diverse species of flowers and grasses, with insects which provide a food source for birds in the surrounding hedges and trees.
Swallowfield Meadow	Swallowfield Meadow	0.7 hectares (1.7 acres)	Swallowfield; 51.377°N 0.958°W; SU 726 647	Wokingham		Map and details	This small site has diverse habitats with grassland, woodland, ditches, hedges and seasonal ponds. Mammals include the endangered water vole and there are trees such as silver birch, field maple and hazel.
Temple Copse	Temple Copse	1.9 hectares (4.7 acres)	Binfield; 51.424°N 0.775°W; SU 853 702	Bracknell Forest		Map and details	This is one of the Three Copses, together with Jock's and Tinkers. The dominant trees in this wood are oak and hazel. Fauna include badgers, squirrels, bullfinches and Eurasian jays.
Thatcham Reedbeds	Thatcham Reed Beds	14.0 hectares (35 acres)	Thatcham; 51.424°N 0.775°W; SU 500 667	West Berkshire	BBOWT, SAC, SSSI	Map and details	The site is described by Natural England as nationally important for its reed beds, fen and species rich alder woods. It is also nationally important for Desmoulin's whorl snails and there are many breeding birds, such as the nationally rare Cetti's warbler. Wetland plants include common valerian, skullcap and marsh bedstraw.
Tinkers Copse	Tinkers Copse	1.9 hectares (4.7 acres)	Binfield; 51.426°N 0.770°W; SU 856 704	Bracknell Forest		Map and details	This ancient coppiced wood has a wide variety of wildlife. Fauna include bullfinches, badgers, roe deer and all three species of British woodpecker.
Whitegrove Copse	Whitegrove Copse	3.6 hectares (8.9 acres)	Warfield; 51.423°N 0.739°W; SU 878 701	Bracknell Forest		Map and details	This site is ancient coppiced woodland with diverse wildlife. Flora include ragged robin and the wild service tree, while there are birds such as bullfinches, blackcap and chiffchaff.

== See also ==
- List of Sites of Special Scientific Interest in Berkshire
- Berkshire, Buckinghamshire and Oxfordshire Wildlife Trust
