= Priestwood =

Area of Bracknell, Berkshire, England

Coordinates: 51.422°N 0.765°W

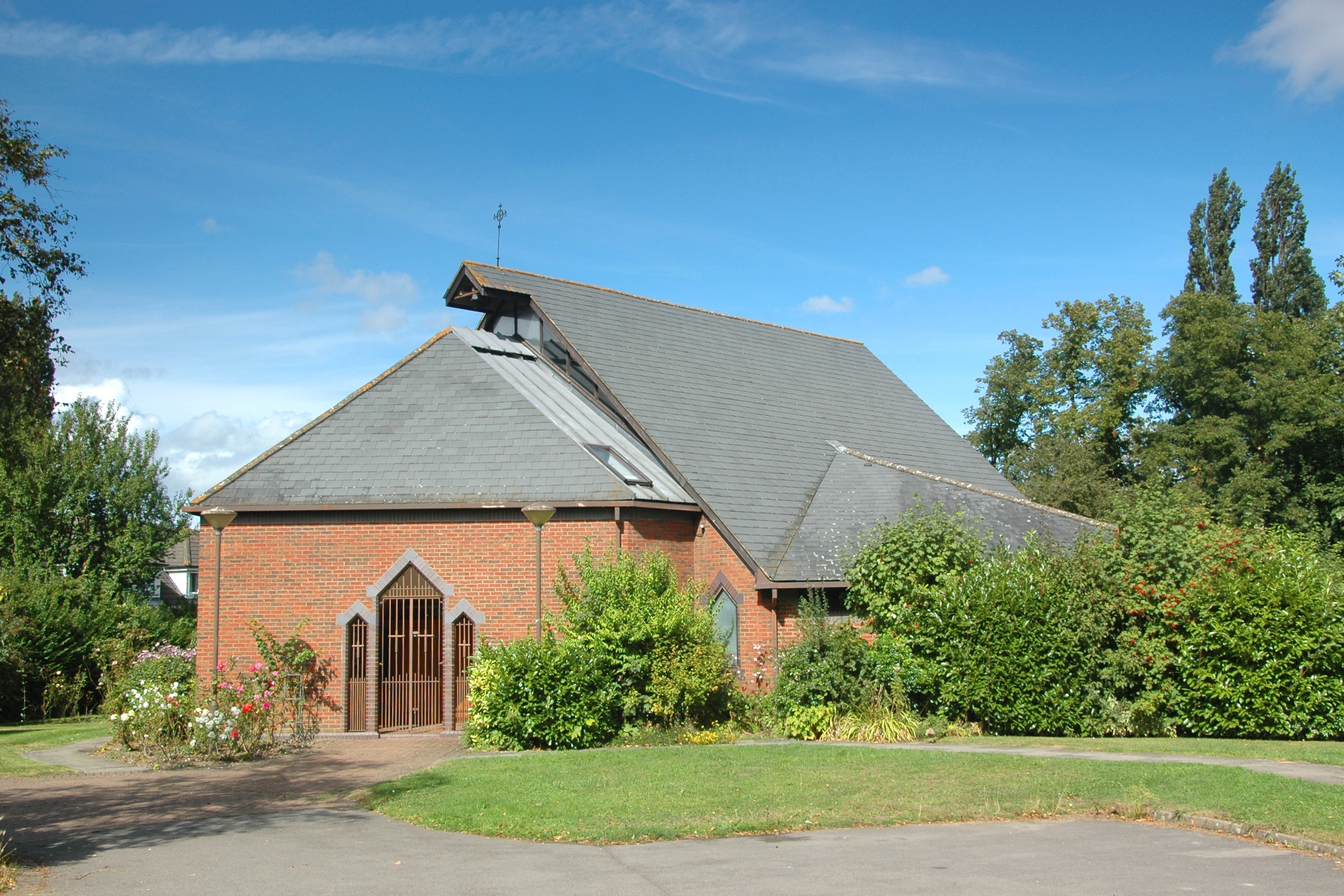
- St Andrew's parish church

- Location within Berkshire
- OS grid reference: SU861697
- Metropolitan borough: Bracknell Forest
- Metropolitan county: Berkshire
- Region: South East
- Country: England
- Sovereign state: United Kingdom
- Post town: Bracknell
- Postcode district: RG42
- Dialling code: 01344
- Police: Thames Valley
- Fire: Royal Berkshire
- Ambulance: South Central
- UK Parliament: Bracknell

Priestwood is a suburb of Bracknell, Berkshire about 1 mile (1.6 km) northwest of the town centre.

== Churches ==
The original Church of England parish church of Saint Andrew was simple Gothic Revival building designed by the architect H.G.W. Drinkwater and completed in 1888. After its centenary the building was demolished and replaced with a new church that was consecrated in April 1990. St. Andrew's was part of the Bracknell Team Ministry. St Andrew's has been part of the Warfield Church family since 2014.

Bracknell Methodist Church is also in Priestwood.

== Amenities ==
Meadow Vale Primary School is in the centre of Priestwood. It has begun an expansion project to enable it to have three classes in each year.

Blue Mountain Golf Club is near Priestwood.

Priestwood has four local nature reserves, three of them Temple Copse, Jock's Copse & Tinkers Copse are known collectively as The Three Copses. The other Nature reserve is called Piggy Wood.

== Sources ==
- Pevsner, Nikolaus (1966). Berkshire. The Buildings of England. Harmondsworth: Penguin Books. pp. 93–94.
