= Wick Hill, Bracknell =

Coordinates: 51.421679°N 0.740809°W

Wick Hill
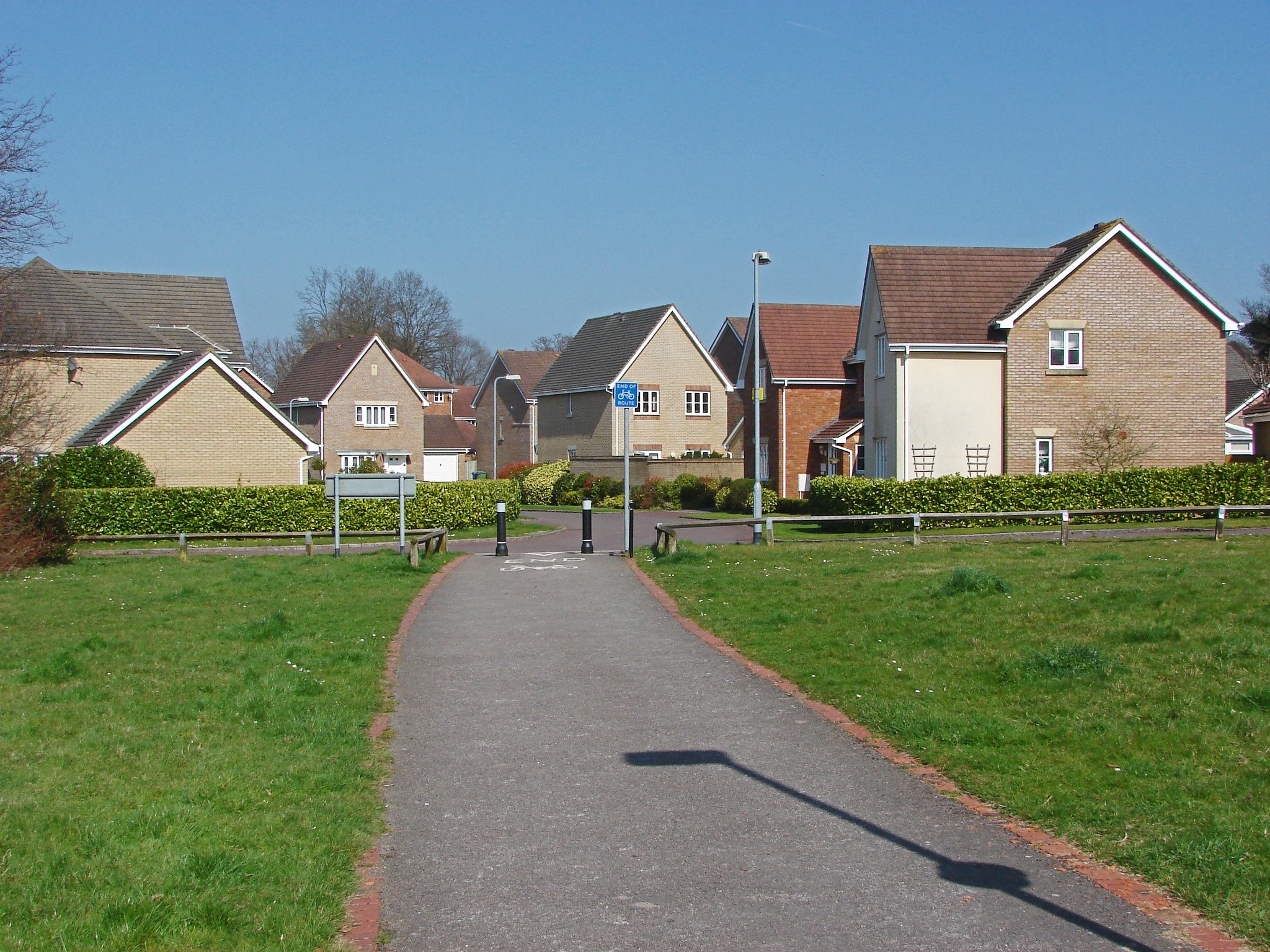

- Location within Berkshire
- OS grid reference: SU876699
- Civil parish: Bracknell
- Unitary authority: Bracknell Forest
- Ceremonial county: Berkshire
- Region: South East
- Country: England
- Sovereign state: United Kingdom
- Post town: BRACKNELL
- Postcode district: RG12
- Dialling code: 01344
- Police: Thames Valley
- Fire: Royal Berkshire
- Ambulance: South Central
- UK Parliament: Bracknell

Wick Hill is a suburb of Bracknell, in the Bracknell Forest district, in the ceremonial county of Berkshire, England.

== Geography ==
The settlement lies north of the A329 road between Bullbrook and Priestwood and is approximately 0.5 miles (0.80 km) north-east of Bracknell town centre. In contrast to these areas Wick Hill was built as privately owned, largely detached, housing.

The area includes Wick Hill House, a residence of 19th-century explorer St. George Littledale, since converted to apartments. Other areas of housing are surrounded by the walls of former Edwardian residence built in 1835.

The suburb has a local nature reserve called Whitegrove Copse.
