= Temple Park =

Suburb of Bracknell, Berkshire, England

Coordinates: 51.425622°N 0.772931°W

- Location within Berkshire
- OS grid reference: SU854702
- Metropolitan borough: Bracknell Forest
- Metropolitan county: Berkshire
- Region: South East
- Country: England
- Sovereign state: United Kingdom
- Post town: BRACKNELL
- Postcode district: RG42
- Dialling code: 01344
- Police: Thames Valley
- Fire: Royal Berkshire
- Ambulance: South Central
- UK Parliament: Maidenhead

Temple Park is a suburb of Bracknell in the English county of Berkshire and part of the civil parish of Binfield. It was built during the 1990s as the town continued to expand on open countryside between Bracknell and Binfield.

The estate lies approximately 1.1 miles (1.8 km) north-west of Bracknell town centre, to the north of the B3408 and to the west of Priestwood.

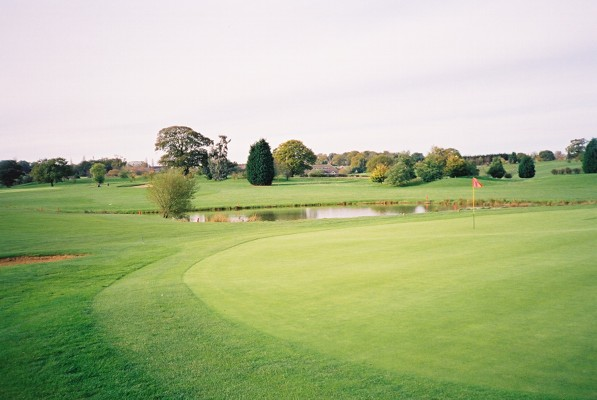
The former Blue Mountain Golf Club

Temple Park is built around Park Farm in Wood Lane, the Home Farm of the old Binfield Manor estate. The Blue Mountain Golf Club was located to the west of the estate .
