= Farley Copse =

Nature reserve in Bracknell, Berkshire, England

Coordinates: 51.419°N 0.780°W

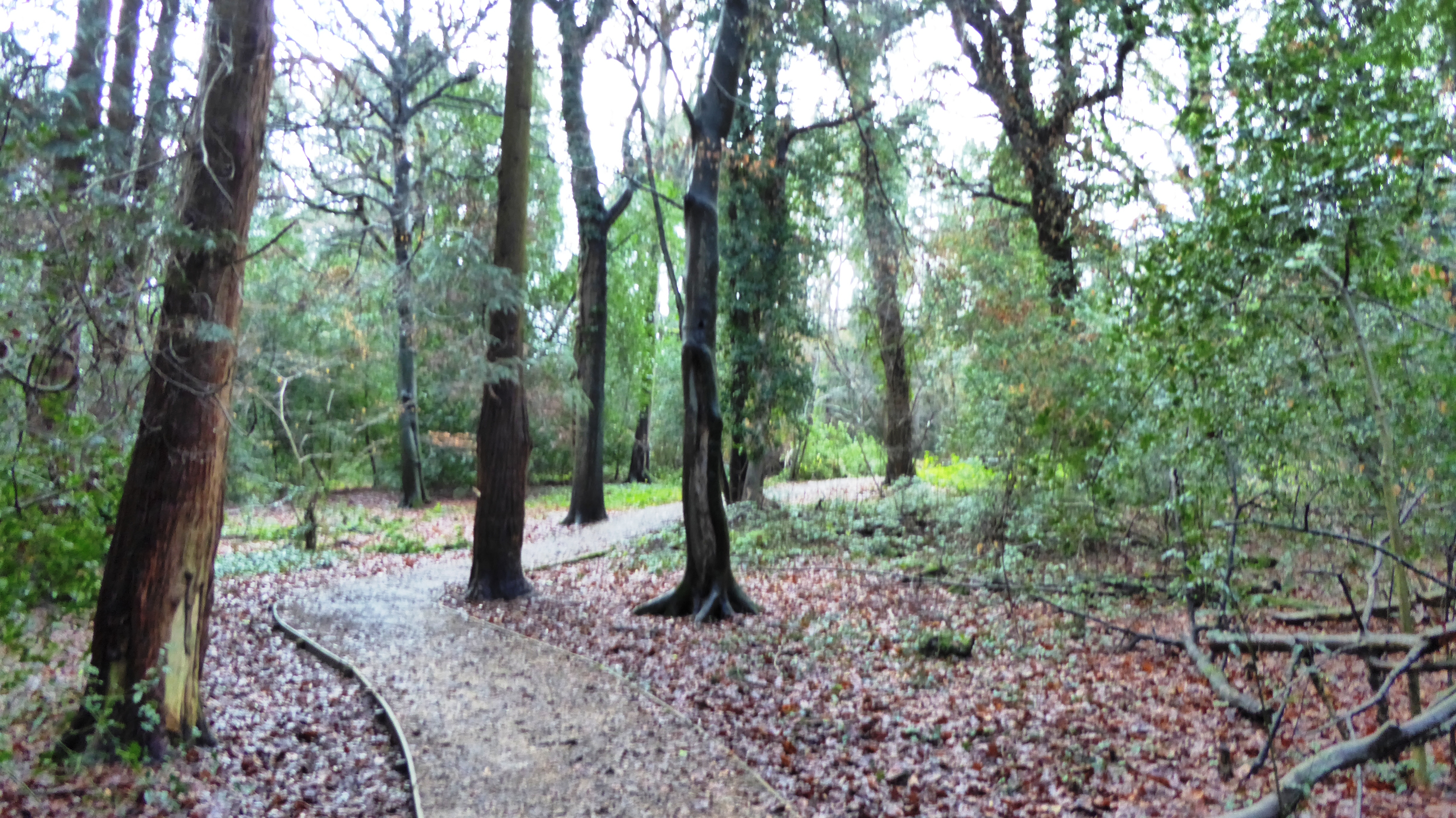
- Interactive map of Farley Copse
- Type: Local Nature Reserve
- Location: Bracknell, Berkshire
- OS grid: SU 849 696
- Area: 3.3 hectares (8.2 acres)
- Manager: Bracknell Forest Borough Council

Farley Copse is a 3.3-hectare (8.2-acre) Local Nature Reserve on the western outskirts of Bracknell in Berkshire. It is owned and managed by Bracknell Forest Borough Council.

== Geography and site ==
This site is ancient woodland, and contains a pond.

== History ==
Farley Copse was once part of a large estate belonging to the Edwardian Farley Moor House.

In 2002 the site was declared as a local nature reserve by Bracknell Forest Borough Council.

== Fauna ==
The site has the following fauna:

=== Mammals ===
- Roe deer
- European badger

=== Invertebrates ===
- Large red damselfly
- Stag beetle
- Libellula depressa

=== Birds ===
- Eurasian bullfinch

== Flora ==
The site has the following flora:

=== Trees ===
- Sequoiadendron giganteum

=== Plants ===
- Anemone nemorosa
- Hyacinthoides non-scripta
