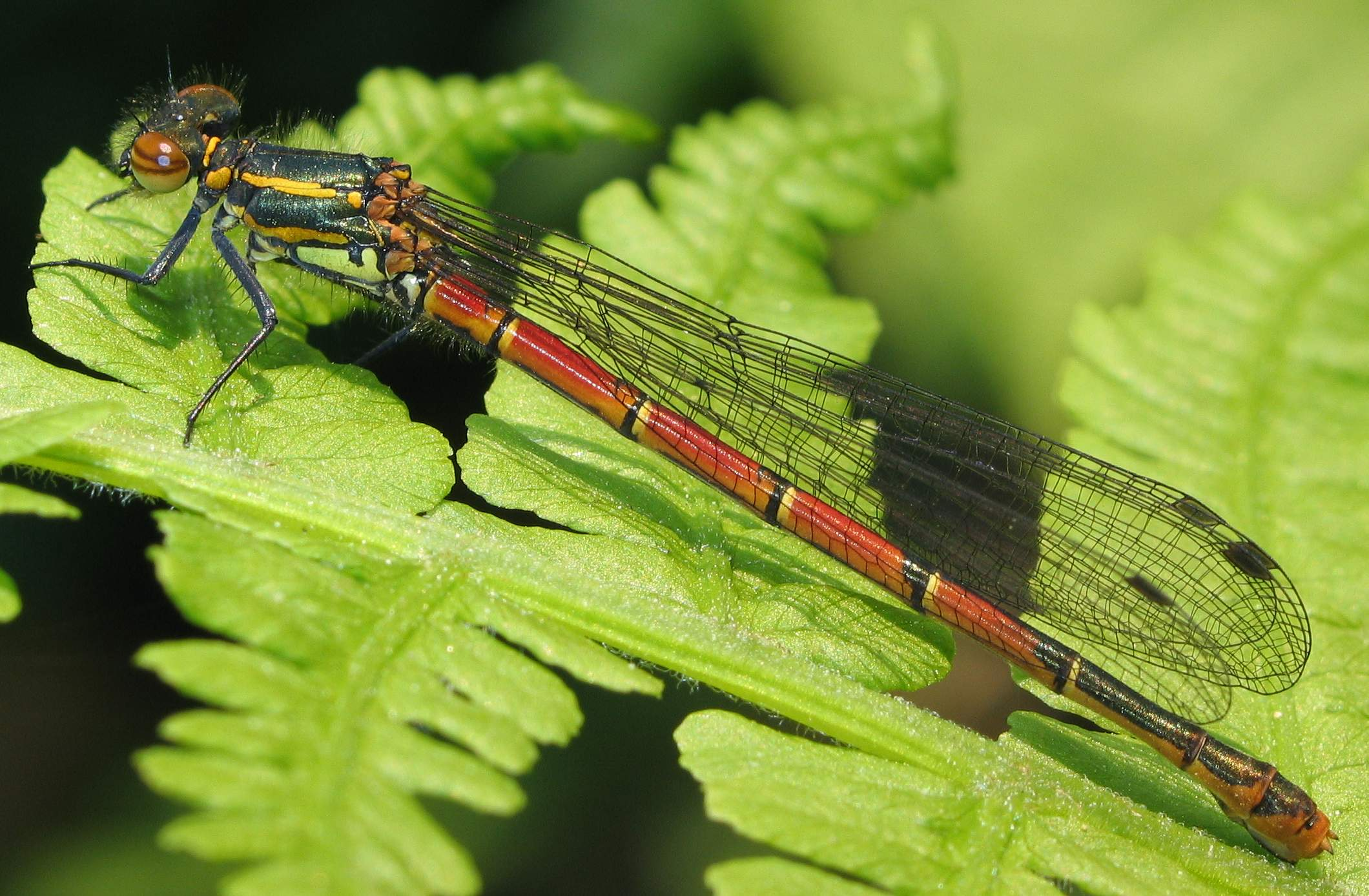
- Pyrrhosoma nymphula

Scientific classification
- Kingdom: Animalia
- Phylum: Arthropoda
- Class: Insecta
- Order: Odonata
- Suborder: Zygoptera
- Family: Coenagrionidae
- Genus: Pyrrhosoma; Charpentier, 1840

= Pyrrhosoma =

Genus of damselflies

Pyrrhosoma is a genus of damselfly in the family Coenagrionidae. It contains the following species:

- Pyrrhosoma elisabethae Schmidt, 1948 – Greek red damselfly
- Pyrrhosoma nymphula (Sulzer, 1776) – large red damselfly

Former congeners Pyrrhosoma latiloba Yu, Yang & Bu, 2008 and P. tinctipenne (McLachlan, 1894) are now placed in genus Huosoma Guan, Dumont, Yu, Han & Vierstraete, 2013.
