= St. George Littledale =

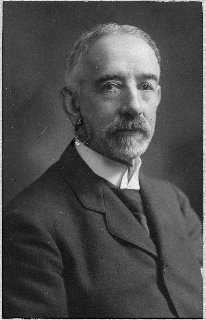
- St. George Littledale in late middle age.
- Born: 8 December 1851; Liverpool, UK
- Died: 16 April 1931 (aged 79)
- Known for: Big game hunting, collecting for museums
- Scientific career
- Fields: Zoology, Geography

Clement St. George Royds Littledale (8 December 1851 – 16 April 1931) and his wife Teresa Harris (Scott) (1839–1928) were known in their time as the greatest British Central Asia travellers of the nineteenth century. Littledale is also considered by many hunters to be one of the greatest big game hunters of all time. He hunted horned game, the sheep and goats, that lived in the mountains of the northern hemisphere, and he collected for the Natural History Museum in London.

== Early life ==
St. George Littledale was born on 8 December 1851, in Liverpool to Thomas Littledale and Julia Royds. His father and grandfather were wealthy cotton brokers and mayors of Liverpool. His full name was Clement St. George Royds Littledale after his maternal grandfather and St George's Hall, a massive Greco-Roman structure in the heart of Liverpool. They called him St. George.

His father died, he attended Rugby School briefly, his mother remarried, and in 1866 he was enrolled at Shrewsbury School. He left after three years without finishing. At age 21 he came into his inheritance and in 1874 he began a trip around the world. Shooting his way through the West Indies and across the United States, he collected birds and mammals for the Liverpool Museum. He sailed to Japan, arriving in Yokohama in October. There he met Teresa Harris Scott, wife of William John Scott, a wealthy Scot. Mrs. Scott was 35 and had been married for 15 years. She was Canadian. Born into a pioneer family, she was the youngest of 12 children of John and Amelia Harris of Eldon House, London, Ontario. Littledale joined the Scotts, traveling with them for eight months including a rugged trip to Kashmir. In June 1875 Scott died of typhoid fever on their ship back to Liverpool. In February 1877 Littledale married Teresa Scott. They spent their honeymoon in Kashmir and Ladakh and were gone for well over a year.

== Expeditions ==
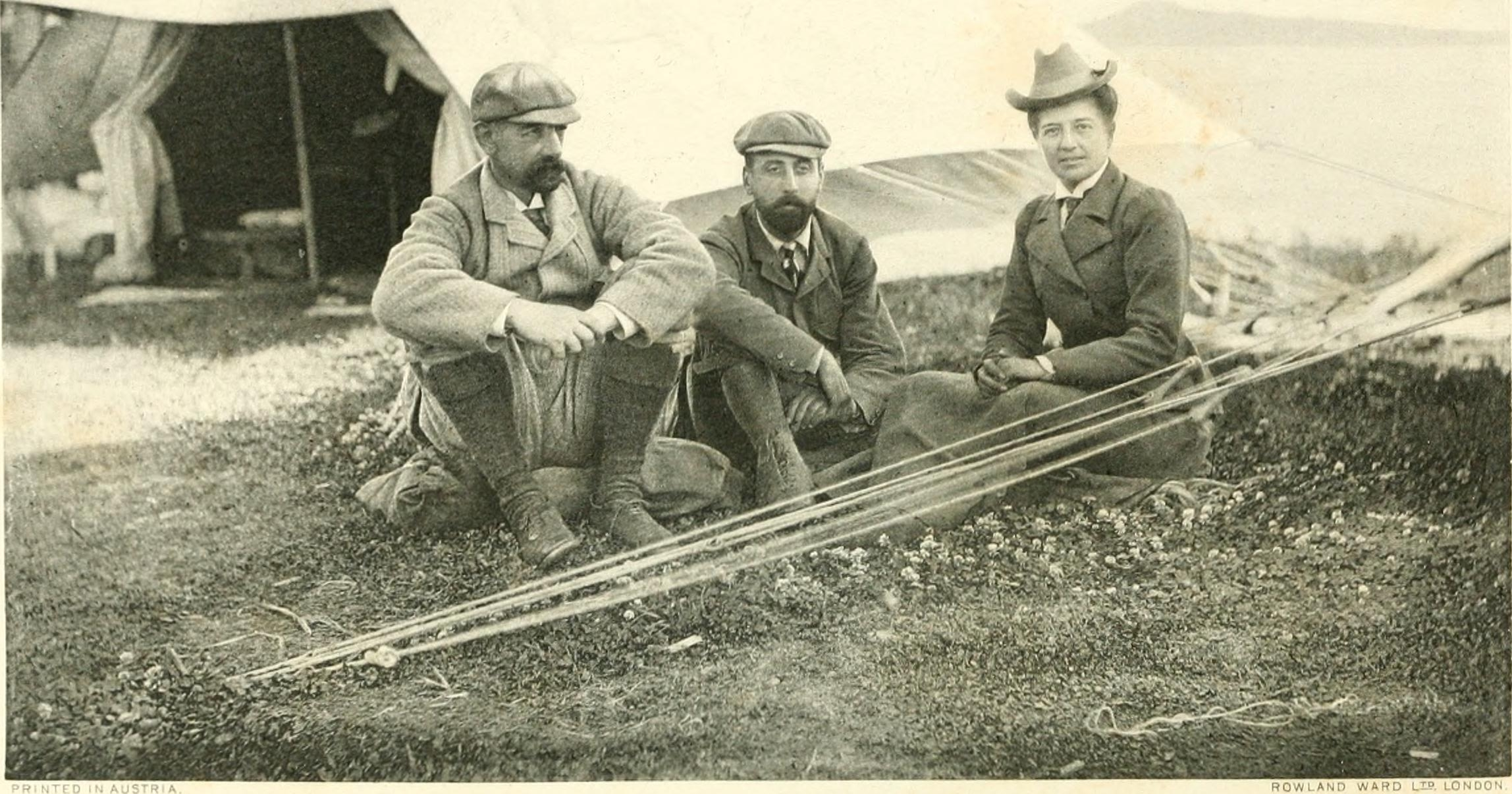
St. George Littledale, Elim Demidov and his wife Sofiaon the sandspit at Petropavlovsk, Russia

For 30 years the Littledales mounted expeditions in North America and Asia, constantly collecting for museums. They began with the American Rockies, Yellowstone, and Alaska, where they gained experience and honed their skills. These trips were followed by expeditions in the late 1880s in the Caucasus, the Pamirs, and Russian Central Asia and Mongolia (Alai and Altai). In 1887 Thomas Moore, Director of the Liverpool Museum, introduced Littledale to Albert Gunther, Keeper of Zoology at the Natural History Museum in London. From then on, Littledale was considered a professional collector. Both he and Teresa took it seriously. It validated their expeditions and gave purpose to their lives. Working as a team, they were willing to collect anything. In addition to mammals, they collected birds, insects, reptiles, fish, and long lists of plants for the Royal Botanic Gardens at Kew.

Littledale then began collecting more than museum specimens. In 1889 he wanted to cross the Pamirs from north to south from Russia into India. In order to boost his chances of gaining permission, he offered to gather intelligence. Although the Foreign Office approved his proposal, the Government of India rejected it, so the Littledales changed their plans and went to Russian Central Asia and Mongolia. In 1890 permission was granted for the Pamirs crossing, the first of the Littledales' three greatest journeys. It was the height of the Great Game, a cold war between Russia and Britain over the vast lands known as Central Asia. The rivalry between the two powers was approaching its climax in that remote desolate region and the Littledales' feat created a sensation in the press. The Littledales spent 1892 at home because of a cholera epidemic in Russia, where they had planned to go. St. George used the time to study map making with John Coles, curator of maps at the Royal Geographical Society. From then on he took great pains to make careful route maps of the unknown areas through which he travelled. In 1893 the Littledales travelled west to east across Russian and Chinese Central Asia and continued all the way to Peking. Littledale brought home the Asian wild camel.

Their greatest exploit was a 14-month journey to Tibet in 1895. With them was W.A.L. Fletcher, Littledale's 25-year-old nephew, one of Oxford's greatest oarsmen. They also brought 7 Ladakhi servants, 3 Pathan sepoys, and Tanny, their fox terrier. They were attempting to reach the forbidden city of Lhasa. It was the great goal of Central Asian explorers but all had failed. The Littledales crossed the Tien Shan to Kashgar, went on to Cherchen, and headed south to cross the desolate Chang Tang, the Tibetan Plateau. Littledale had selected the route to avoid meeting Tibetans until they neared Lhasa. Along the way Littledale measured Ulugh Muztagh, a high mountain in the remote Kun Lun range of northern Tibet, but exaggerated its height. Eventually the party encountered 150 armed Tibetans at a 19,000-foot pass. They were allowed to continue over the pass to a suitable stopping place. They were within 49 miles of Lhasa, closer than any other foreigners since Huc and Gabet in 1846, until Sir Francis Younghusband marched in with the British Army in 1904. During a harrowing retreat out of Tibet, Teresa was so ill from dysentery that she had to be carried for 1,200 miles. In June 1896 the Royal Geographical Society awarded its Patron's Medal to St. George Littledale for his three great expeditions.

In 1897 the Littledales travelled with Prince Elim Demidov and his wife Sofia to Siberia and the Mongolian Altai. Teresa was older and this was her last expedition. In 1900 Littledale joined the Demidovs on a trip to Kamchatka. In 1901 he went to the Tien Shan alone and brought home a large collection of mammals, including a record Asiatic ibex. Teresa had been the primary plant collector but this time Littledale collected a long list of plants. The Natural History Museum decided one of the sheep was a new variety and they named it after him, calling it Ovis littledalei (now known as Littledale argali, Ovis ammon littledalei).

In 1902 King Edward drove to the Littledales' house for lunch. He asked for Littledale's prize trophy, the record ibex head from the Tien Shan, and Littledale had to oblige.

In 1903 the Littledales visited New Zealand, where St. George suggested that the climate and terrain were suitable for the importation of certain game animals. He now became involved in the collection of live animals. It was a complex international project, during which he developed a long friendship with President Theodore Roosevelt.

Littledale hunted in Newfoundland in 1907 and then in the East Caucasus in 1908. The Littledales continued to travel extensively together to far-flung places but not at the expedition level. In 1919 Littledale became a Justice of the Peace for Berkshire. A fine expedition leader, he now established a reputation as a judge for being thoughtful, kind, and judicious.

== Later life and death ==
Teresa Littledale died suddenly in 1928. In 1931 St. George spent six weeks salmon fishing on the Spey in Scotland. He returned home ill and died on 16 April. He was 79.

During his main expedition years, Littledale donated 122 mammals to the Natural History Museum from the Caucasus, Central Asia, and Kamchatka. Others went to the Liverpool Museum. Both museums had already received numerous other trophies over the years as well as quantities of birds and the mammals included many record heads. After Littledale died, the Natural History Museum selected 94 additional trophies from about 150 that filled his home, Wick Hill House in Bracknell, Berkshire. In Big Game Shooting Records, published the following year, Edgar Barclay wrote:

"As a hunter of big game in the Northern Hemisphere, the name of Littledale must surely stand alone. His success in this sphere has never I think been equalled, most certainly never surpassed."

A memorial to Littledale appeared in the Geographical Journal. It was written by Sir Francis Younghusband, symbol of British exploration in Central Asia and of the Great Game. He wrote:

"...his name has never been so well known as his achievements entitled it to be. And perhaps the fact that he took his wife with him on all his three great journeys predisposed people to think they could not have been very adventurous or arduous. . . . And as a fact, every one of their journeys would nowadays be considered an accomplishment of note."

== Records of Big Game ==
Some of Littledale's trophies still rank high on the list of Rowland Ward's Records of big game. As for the 28th edition, 13 of the 19 heads of Caucasian Chamois recorded were hunted by Litteldale, including the 2nd and 3rd largest.

His Nilgiri Tahr still ranks 1st in the list, hunted at Nilgiris, India in 1898. He also holds the 1st and 2nd largest Dagaestan Tur trophies and other 4 ranking in the list. Among other trophies listed in the record book are the Tian Shan Ibex (32nd), Altai Argali (14th), Rocky Mountain Big Horn Sheep, Kamchatka Snow Sheep, Yak, European Bison, Pronghorn.

== See also ==
- History of exploration in Tibet
