= Alastair Driver =

English conservationist, rewilder and explorer

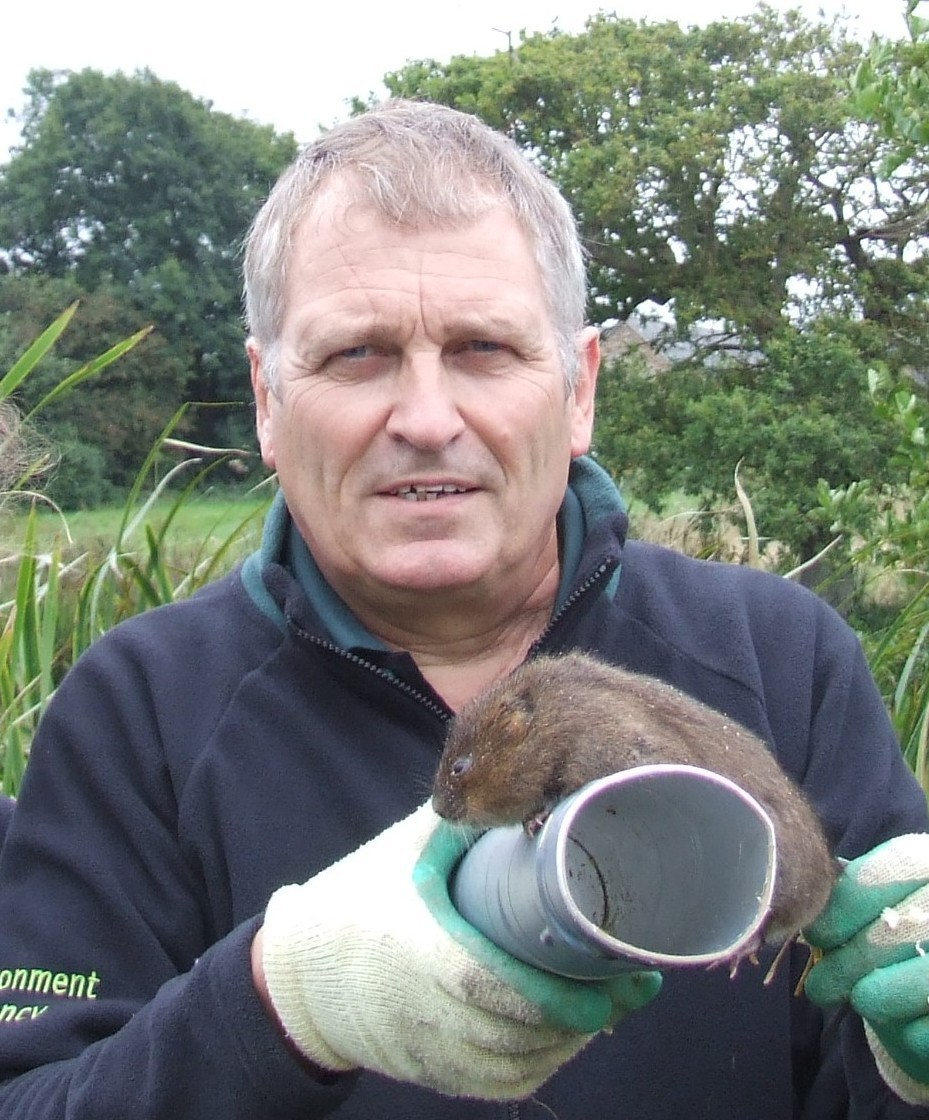
Alastair Driver with water vole - Bude, Cornwall

Alastair James Driver is an English ecologist, conservationist and rewilding specialist. He is an Honorary Professor of Applied Environmental Management at the University of Exeter. He was the National Conservation Manager for the Environment Agency (2002 - 2016) and was appointed as Director of Rewilding Britain in 2017. He is the creator and voluntary warden of Ali's Pond Local Nature Reserve in Sonning, Berks, which carries his name.

== Education ==
Alastair Driver was born in Gloucester, England and educated at Randwick C of E Primary School and Marling School in Stroud, Gloucestershire. He studied ecology at Lancaster University and was awarded a BSc Hons degree in 1978. Driver was appointed as an Honorary Professor in Applied Environmental Management by the University of Exeter in 2016.

== Career ==
Driver was appointed as the first conservation officer for the Thames Water Authority in 1984 and oversaw the development of river and wetland conservation policies, procedures and projects in the Thames catchment through the formation of the National Rivers Authority in 1989 and the Environment Agency in 1996. During this period he initiated many partnership projects with voluntary organisations in the River Thames catchment, including otter habitat projects and water vole projects with county Wildlife Trusts, aimed at the conservation and recovery of these threatened species. During this period he also oversaw the environmental aspects of many hundreds of river engineering schemes including the Jubilee River in Berkshire.

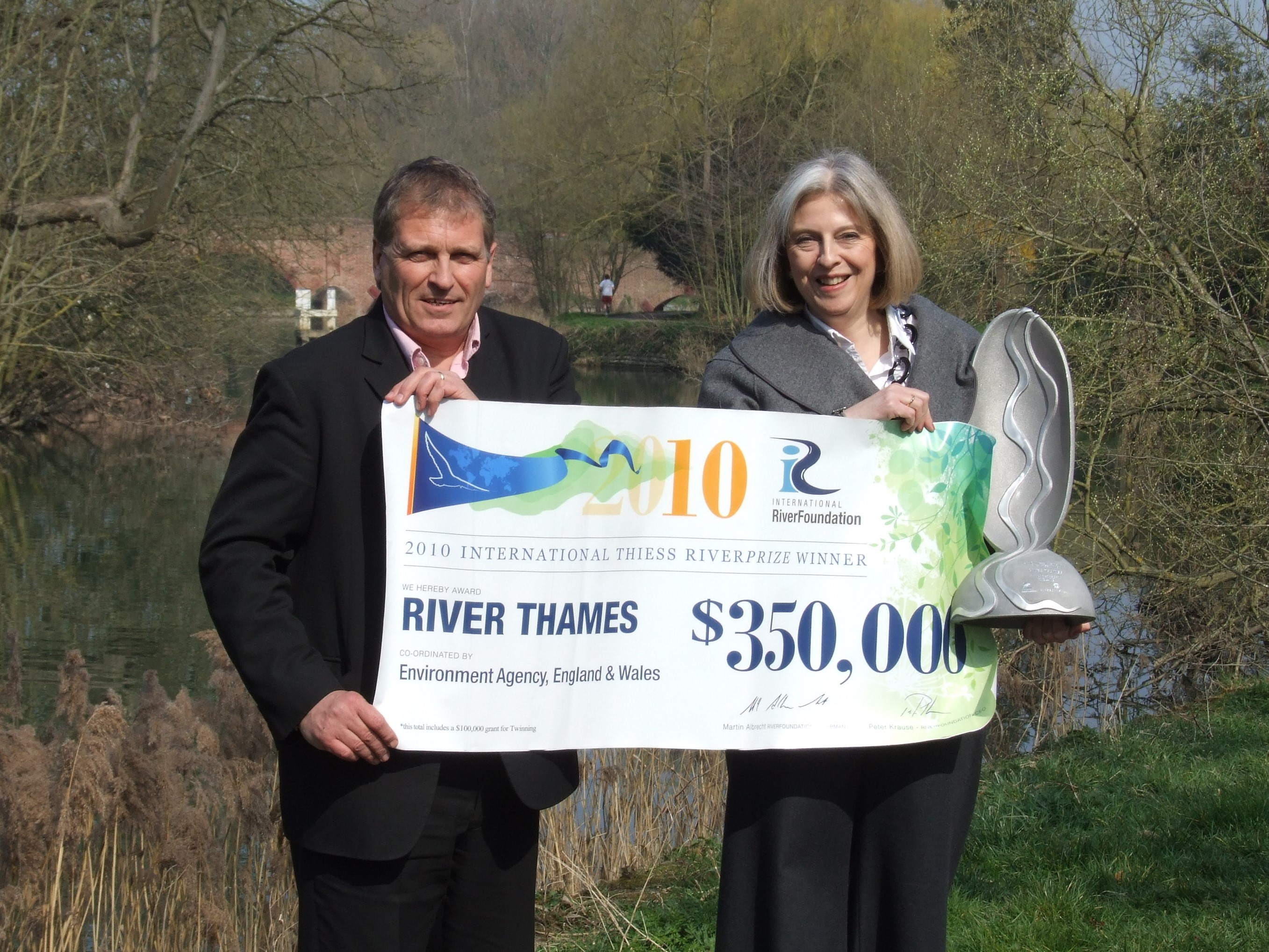
Alastair Driver with Theresa May MP

In 2002 Driver was appointed as National Conservation Manager for the Environment Agency, until taking early retirement from public service in 2016. He founded or co-founded initiatives, including the River Restoration Project, the River Restoration Centre the European Riverprize, the UK Riverprize, SuDS for Schools and Catchments in Trust. In 1997 Driver set up the UK Water Vole Conservation Group which he chaired until September 2016. This group oversaw the delivery of the Biodiversity Action Plan for this declining species, including securing full legal protection for water voles in 2008. In recent years, Driver has been a strong advocate of natural flood management and especially the acquisition of evidence on the multiple benefits of working with natural processes when managing river catchments. His ongoing compilation of this evidence, known as "Killer Facts", is published online by the Natural Environment Research Council.

Driver was appointed as Director of Rewilding Britain in January 2017. In 2020 he was described by Environment Minister Lord Goldsmith as being "a fantastic influence on the national debate around rewilding who could take the credit for rewilding becoming more mainstream".

== Recognition and honours ==
- Ambassador for the International Riverfoundation - 2008
- International Riverprize on behalf of the River Thames - 2010
- Fellow of the Chartered Institute of Ecology and Environmental Management (CIEEM) - 2012
- CIEEM Small Conservation Projects Award, on behalf of the Friends of Ali's Pond - 2016
- Honorary Professor status by University of Exeter - 2016
- Technical Advisor and team member for "A Rewilding Britain Landscape" Gold Medal Winner and Best in Show at The RHS Chelsea Flower Show 2022
- Included in the ENDS Report Power Lists for 2022 and 2023 of the top 100 environmental professionals who have made the greatest impact over the previous two years.

== Personal life ==
Alastair Driver has been married to Belinda since 1980 and they have three sons, Daniel, Liam and Kieran. He has lived in Sonning, Berkshire since 1987.
