= Park Wood and Goulding's Wood =

Protected area in Berkshire, England

Coordinates: 51.546°N 0.770°W

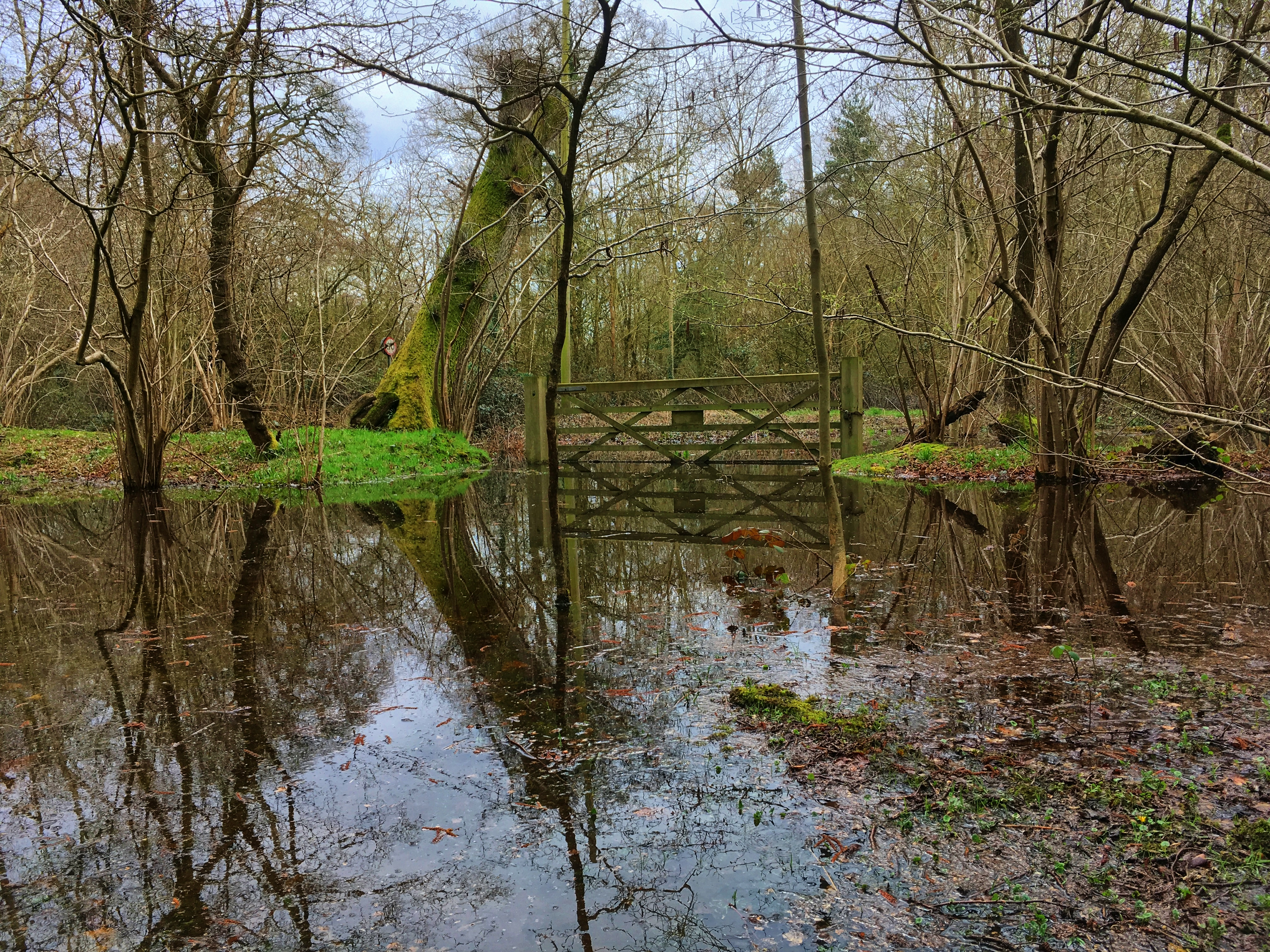
- Interactive map of Park Wood and Goulding's Wood
- Type: Local Nature Reserve
- Location: Maidenhead, Berkshire
- OS grid: SU 854 837
- Area: 35.3 hectares (87 acres)
- Manager: Woodland Trust

Park Wood and Goulding's Wood is a 35.3-hectare (87-acre) Local nature reserve north-west of Maidenhead in Berkshire, England. It is owned by the Royal Borough of Windsor and Maidenhead and managed by the Woodland Trust.

This mature wood is mainly oak and beech on clay soils. There are several sequoia trees which were planted in the Victorian period. There are ponds and dells in the north of the site, which is dominated by rhododendrons.

There is access from Marlow Road.
