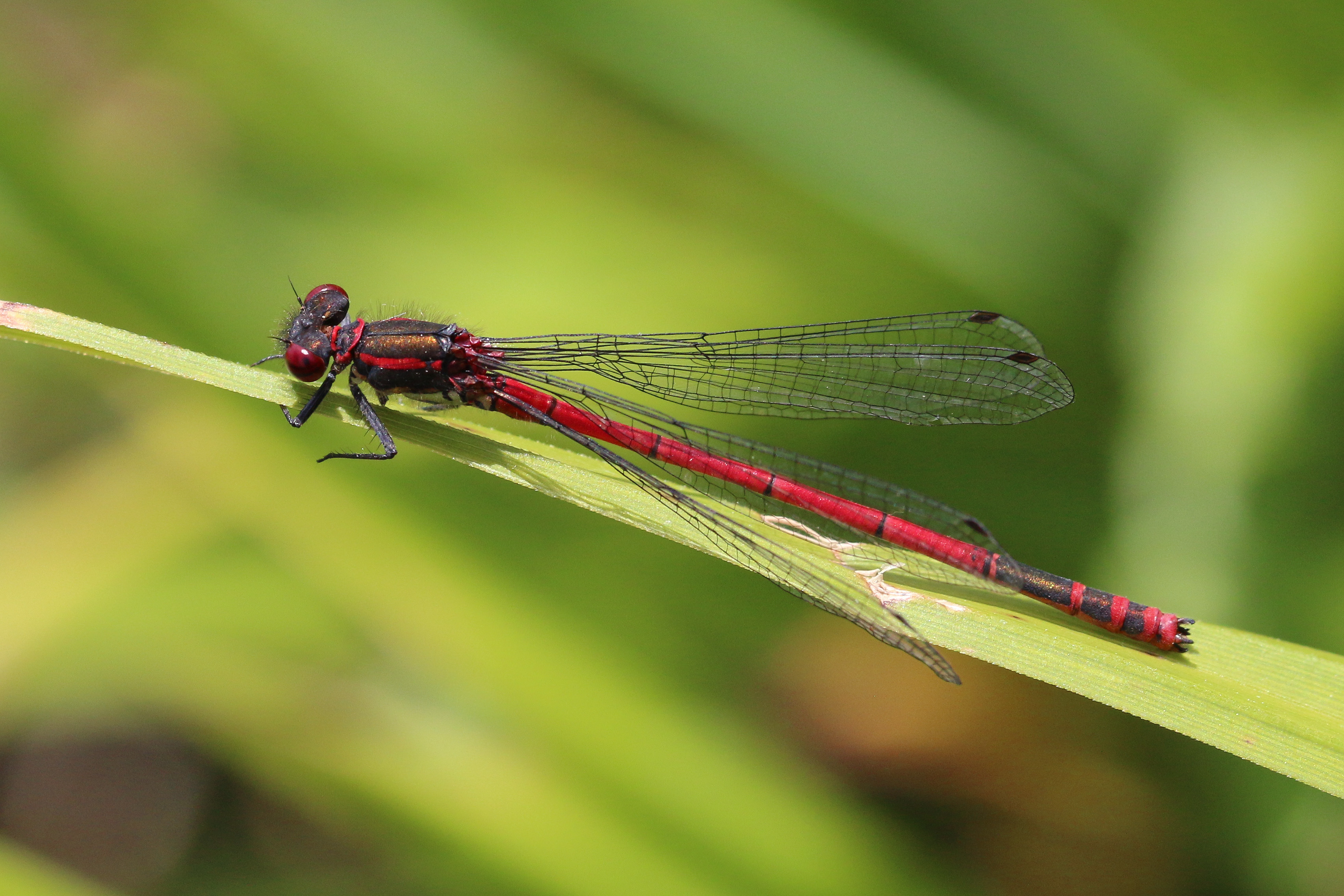
- Male, Dry Sandford Pit, Oxfordshire
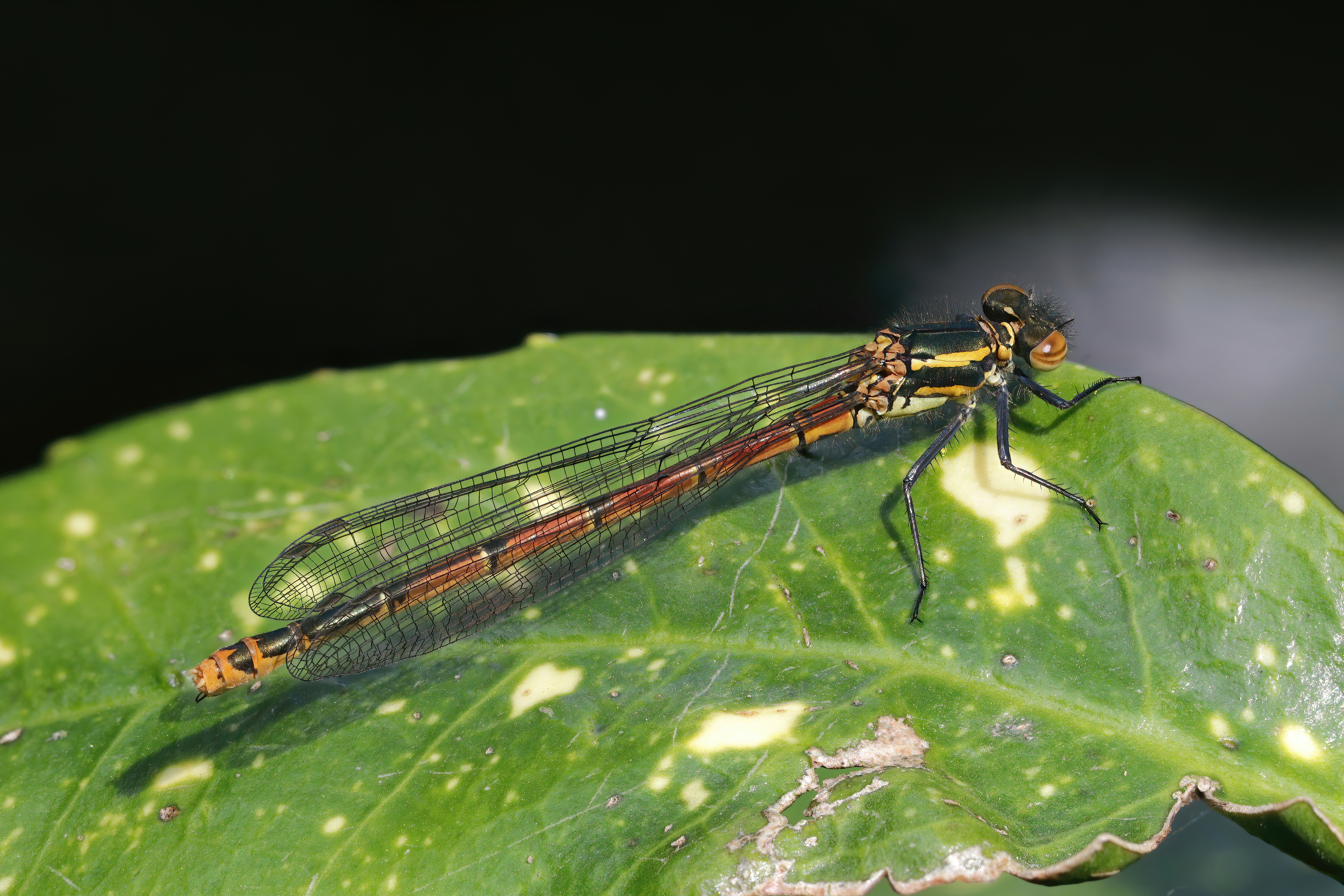
- Female, form fulvipes Cumnor Hill, Oxford

Conservation status
- Least Concern (IUCN 3.1)

Scientific classification
- Kingdom: Animalia
- Phylum: Arthropoda
- Class: Insecta
- Order: Odonata
- Suborder: Zygoptera
- Family: Coenagrionidae
- Genus: Pyrrhosoma
- Species: P. nymphula

Binomial name
- Pyrrhosoma nymphula (Sulzer, 1776)

Synonyms
- List: Libellula minius Harris, 1782; Libellula nymphula Sulzer, 1776; Moroagrion danielli Needham & Gyger, 1939; Pyrrhosoma interposita Varga, 1968; Pyrrhosoma nymphula interpositum Varga, 1968

= Large red damselfly =

Species of insect

The large red damselfly (Pyrrhosoma nymphula) is a species of damselflies belonging to the family Coenagrionidae. It is native to the western Palearctic.

== Distribution ==
This species is a mainly European damselfly, with some populations in Northern Africa and Western Asia.

== Habitat ==
These damselflies inhabit small ponds, lakes and dikes, and occasionally slow-moving rivers. They tend to avoid fast flowing water.

== Description ==
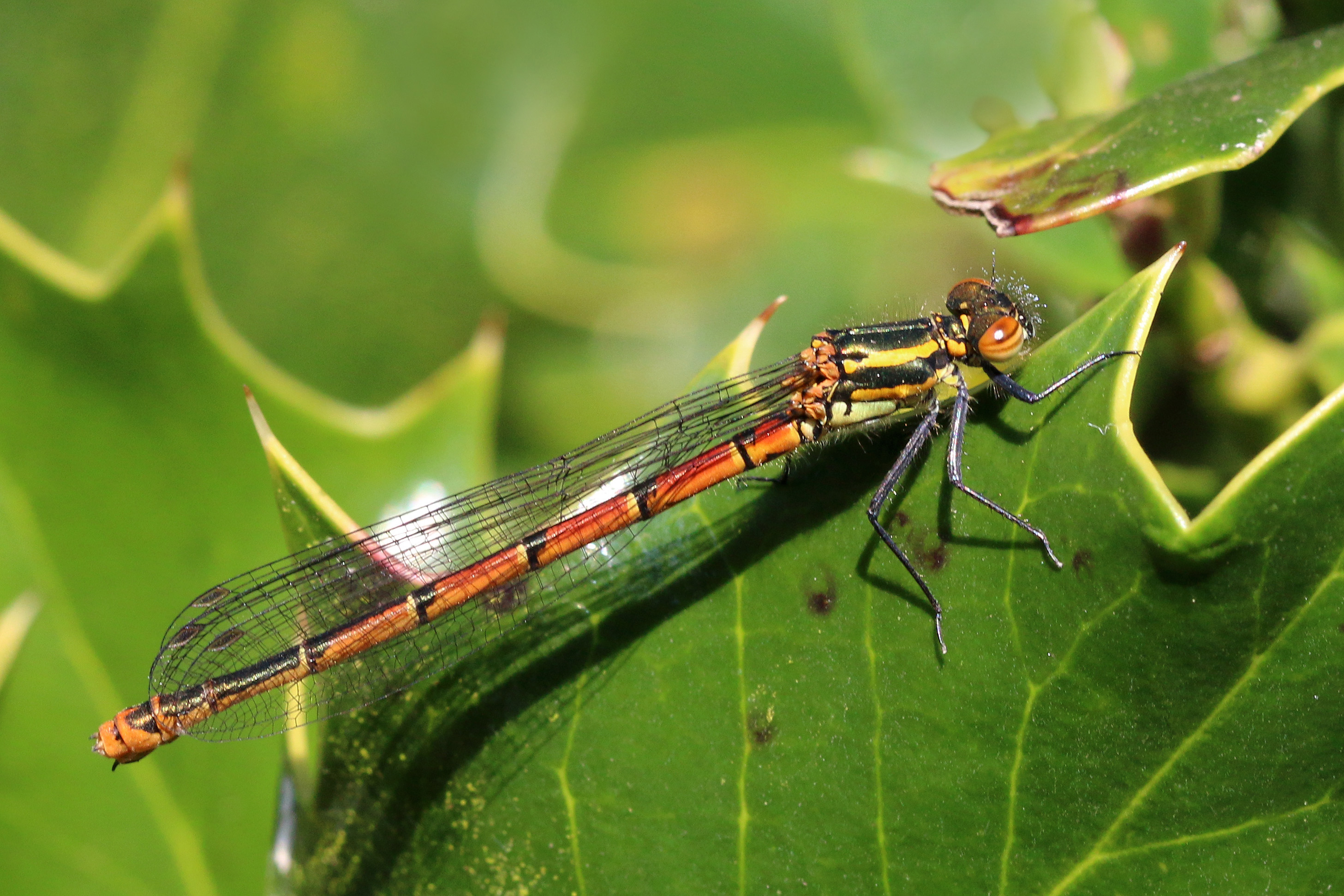
Immature female, form typica, Cumnor Hill, Oxford

Pyrrhosoma nymphula can reach a body length of 33–36 millimetres (1.3–1.4 in). These large and robust damselflies show black legs and wing spots in both sexes.

Mature males have red eyes and a black thorax with red shoulder stripes in mature specimen, but yellow stripes in immature. In fact ante-humeral stripes change to red with age. Abdomen is red with black small rings and bronze-black bands towards the apex (segments 7-9). Wings are hyaline, with a blackish pterostigma. Mature females occur in three colour forms (typical, fulvipes and melanotum), from mostly black to mostly red, but all have yellow bands around the abdominal segments. Some intermediate forms also exist.

The form typica has more black on its abdominal segments than the form fulvipes, particularly on segment 6. Immatures have lighter eyes and have yellow stripes on the thorax, not red. In the form melanotum females show the upper surface of the abdomen almost entirely black.

These damselflies can easily be confused with small red damselflies, but the latter has orange legs, while the large red damselfly has black legs. In Greece and Albania a closely related species occurs, the Greek red damsel (Pyrrhosoma elisabethae). They look very much the same, the females only having a slightly different pronotum with deep folds in the hind margin. The males differ in their lower appendages, which are longer than the upper ones, while the black hook on the lower appendages is half as long as in the large red damselfly. The appendages of the large red damselfly can be seen in the gallery below.

== Biology and behaviour ==
The great red damselfly is often the first damselfly to emerge, usually in April or May. Adults can be found until September, according to locality.

Immature adults mature in about two weeks. Mating occurs in vegetation. The female during the laying of eggs is accompanied by the male, she immerses into the water only the abdomen. Eggs hatch in two-three weeks. Development of larvae takes two years. Larvae feed on aquatic insect larvae, protozoa, rotifers or small crustaceans.

== Gallery ==
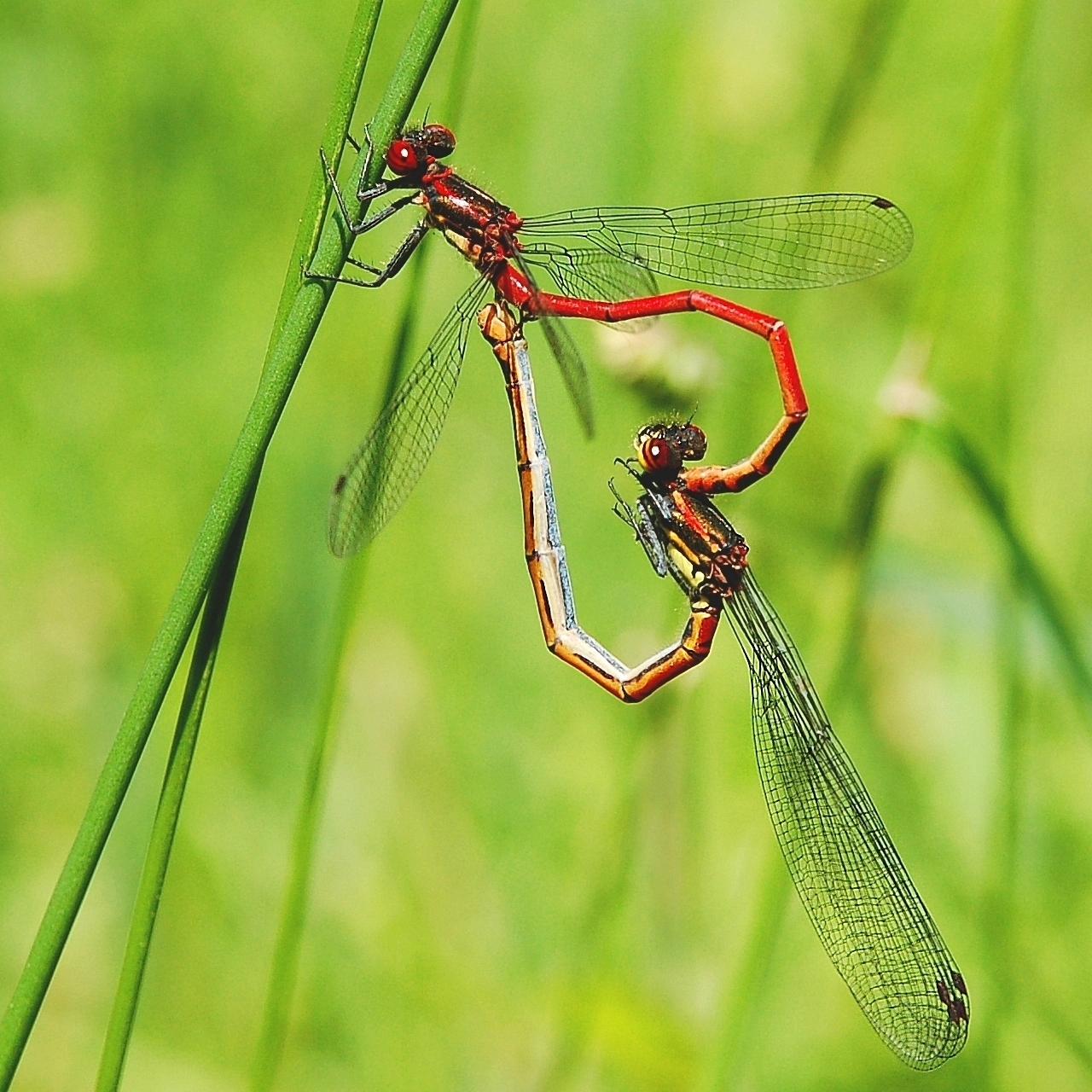
Mating

Video of oviposition

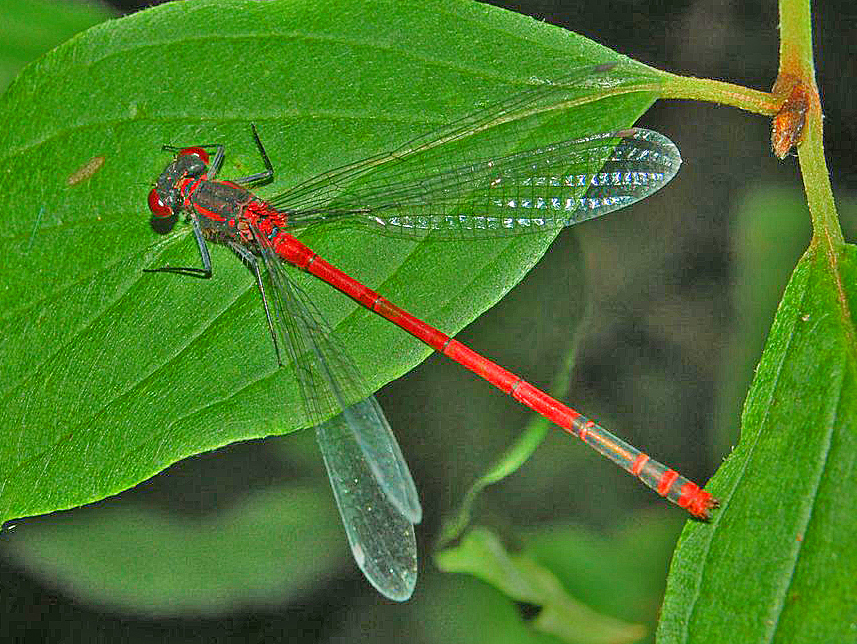
Male, dorsal view

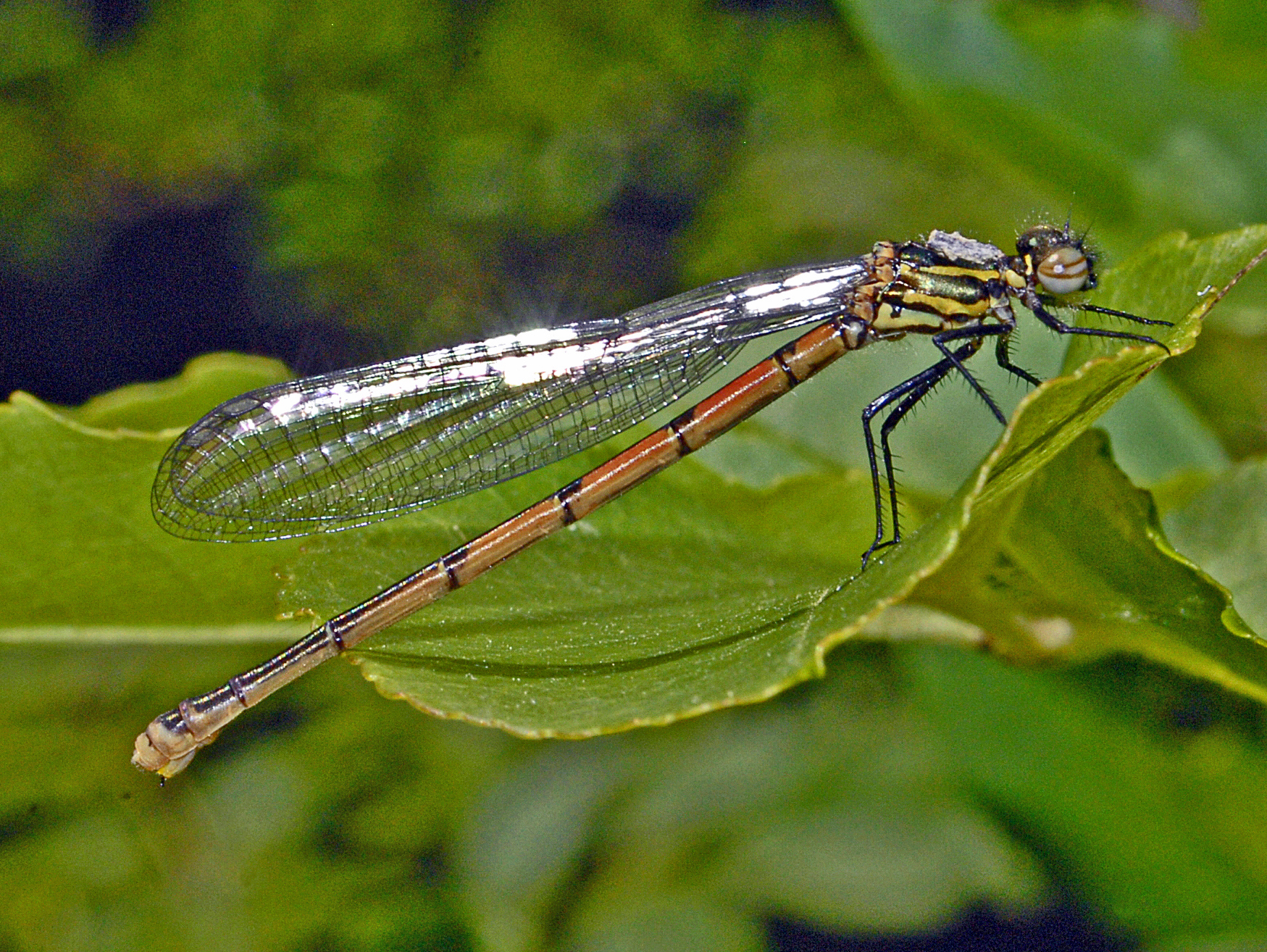
Female, side view

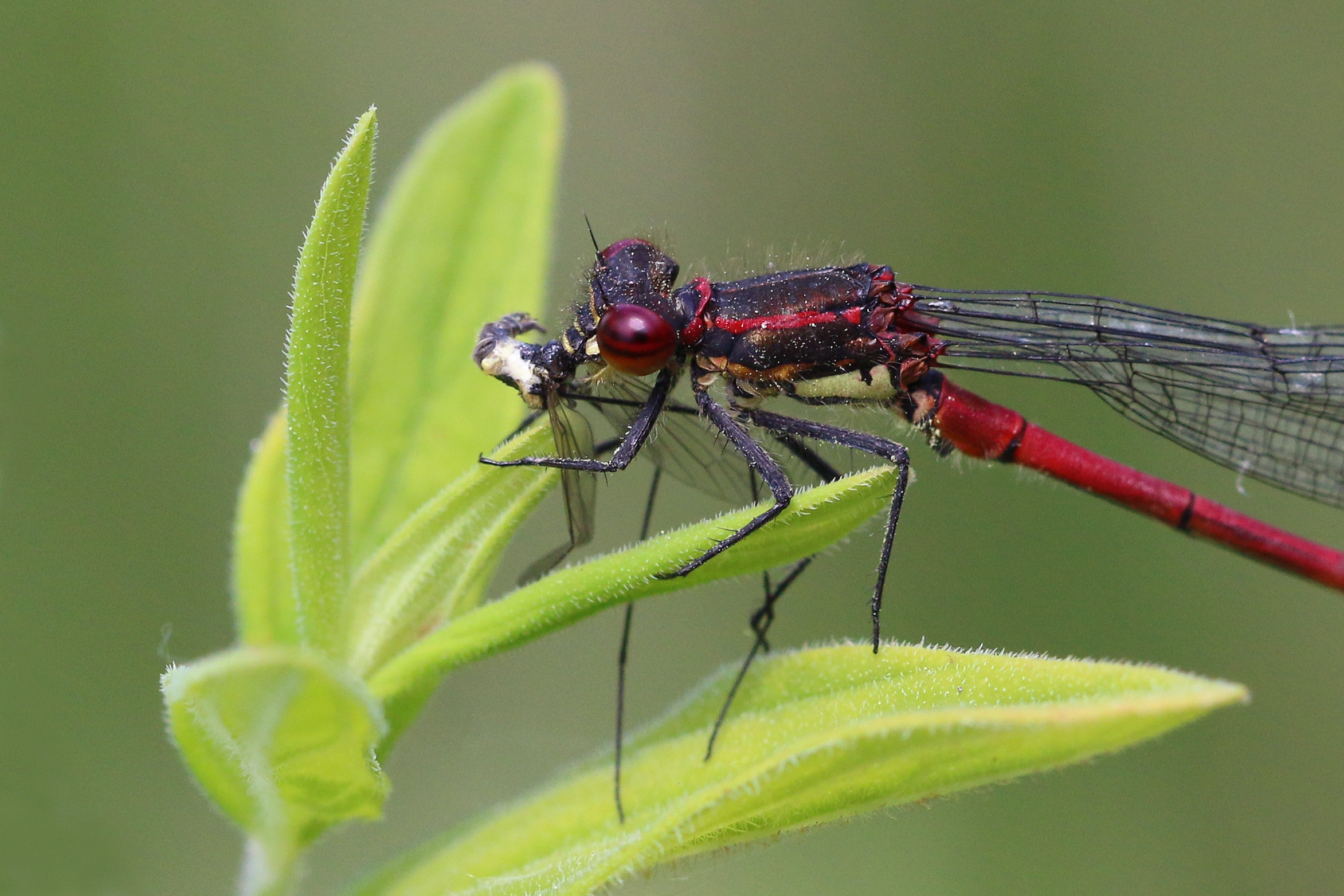
Male eating insect
Dry Sandford Pit, Oxfordshire

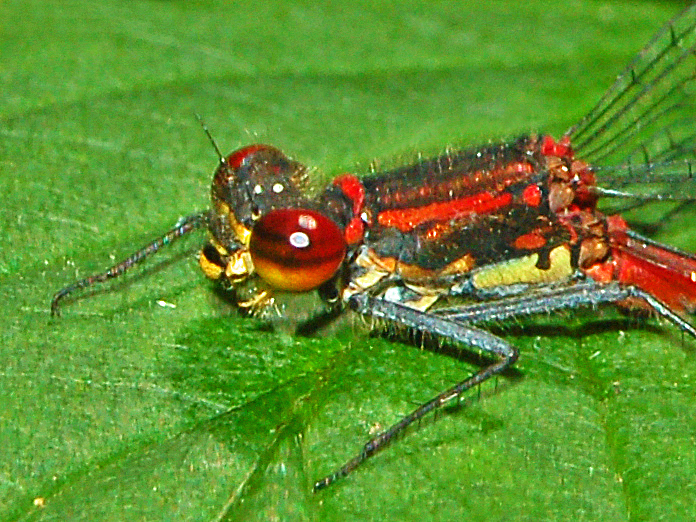
Male. Thorax close-up

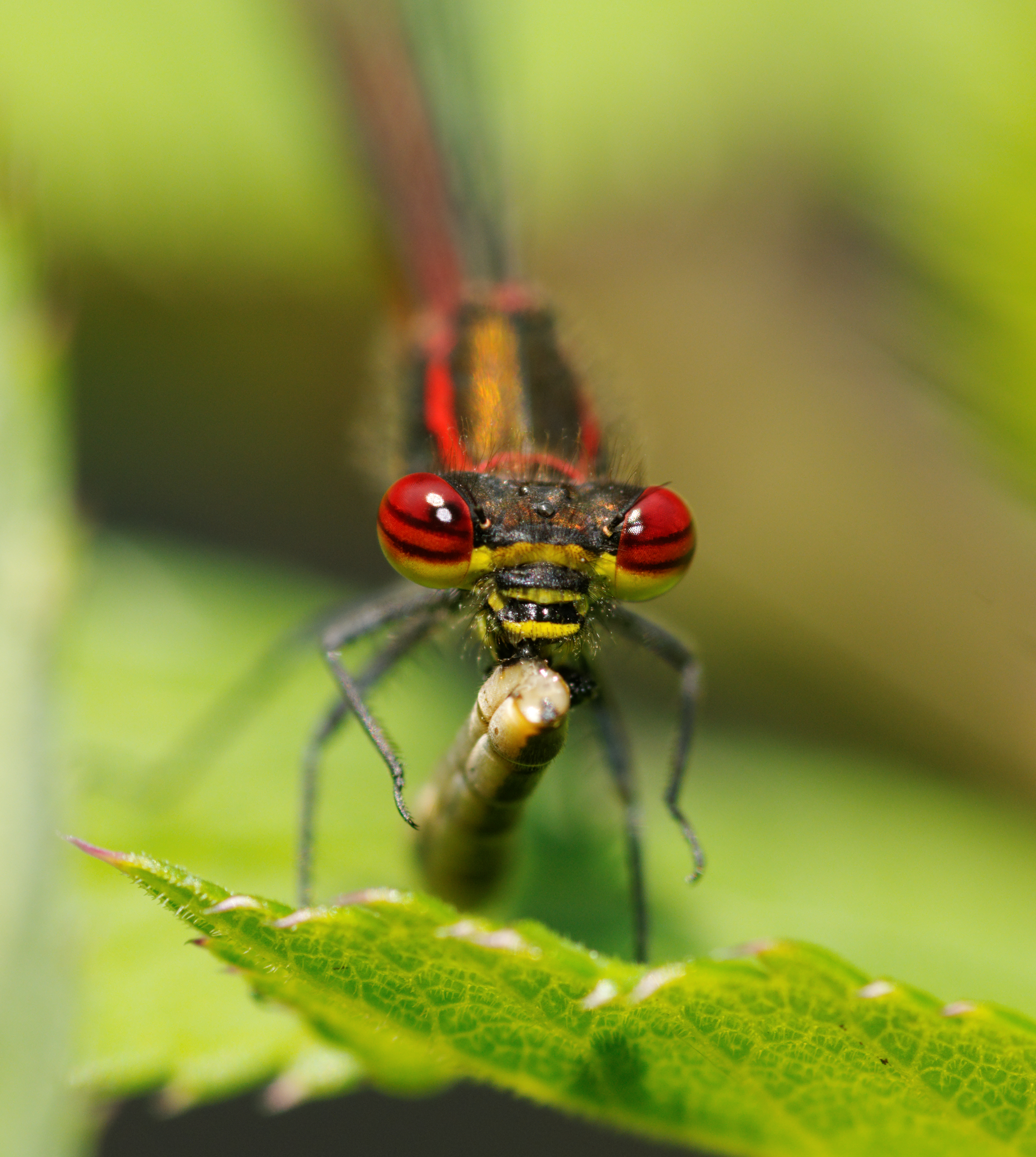
Eyes close-up

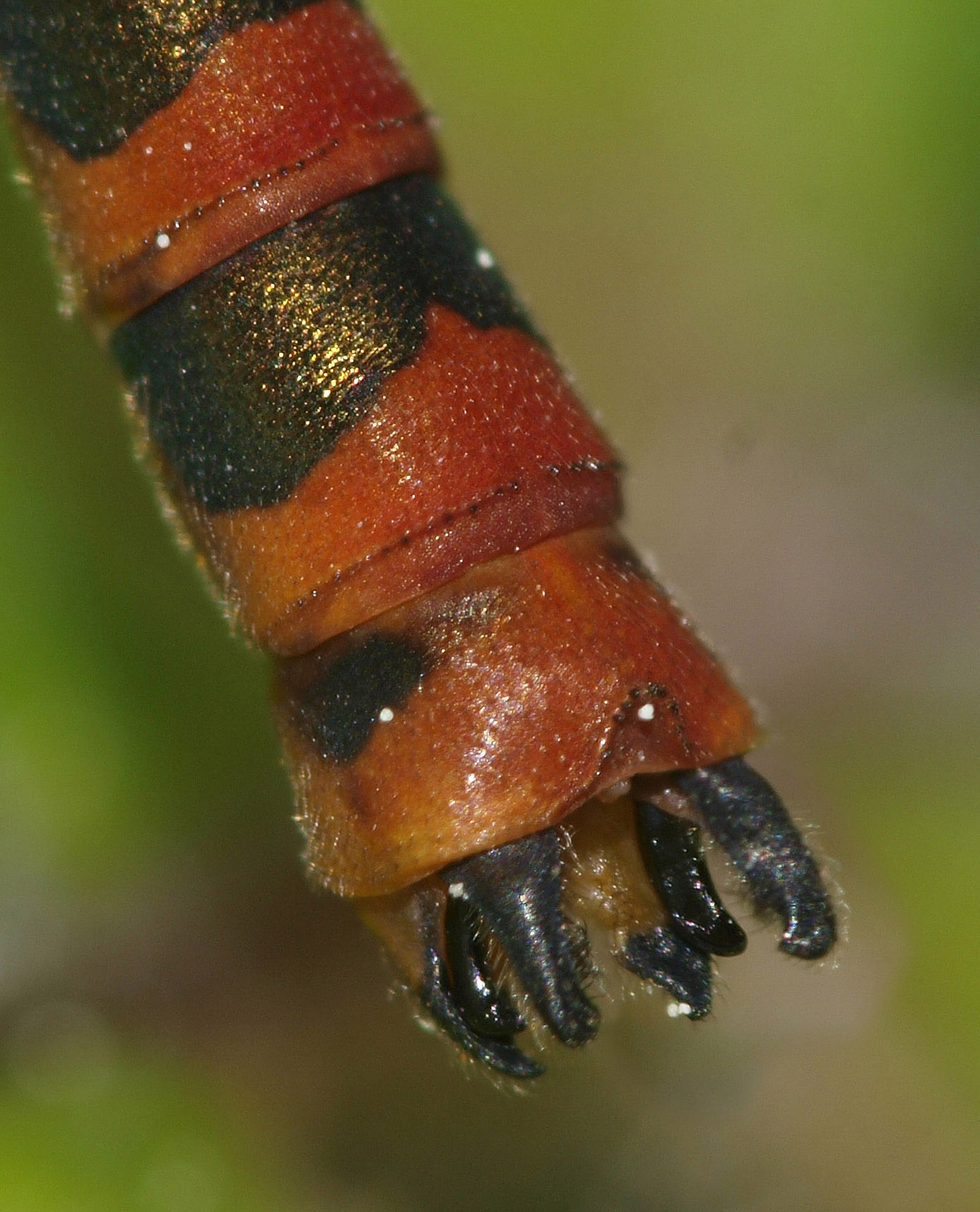
Male appendages
