= Bradnam Wood =

Nature reserve in Berkshire, United Kingdom

Coordinates: 51.549°N 0.780°W

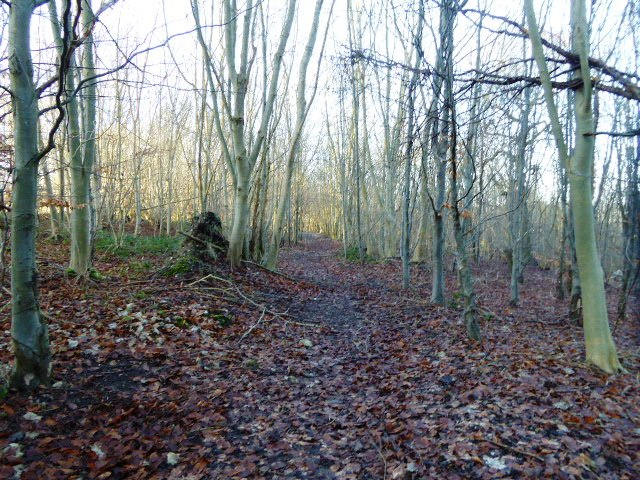
- Interactive map of Bradnam Wood
- Type: Local Nature Reserve
- Location: Maidenhead, Berkshire
- OS grid: SU 847 840
- Area: 12.5 hectares (31 acres)
- Manager: The Woodland Trust

Bradnam Wood is a 12.5-hectare (31-acre) Local Nature Reserve west of Maidenhead in Berkshire. It is owned by the Royal Borough of Windsor and Maidenhead and managed by The Woodland Trust.

This site has mature woodland at the northern end and more recently planted trees in the south. In the middle is a field which has chalk grassland plants and large anthills.

There is access from Marlow Road.
