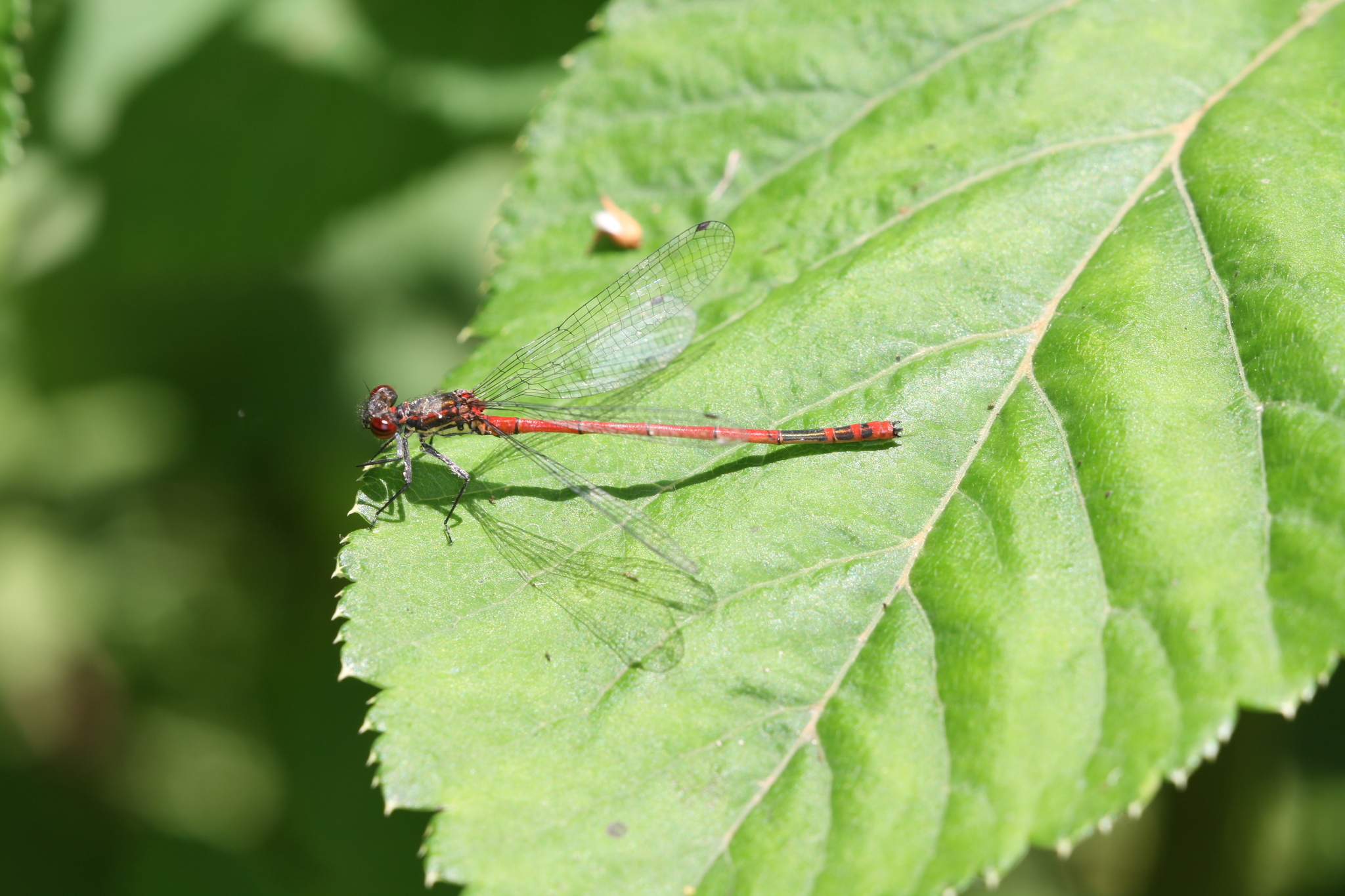
- In Gjirokastër, Albania

Conservation status
- Critically Endangered (IUCN 3.1)

Scientific classification
- Kingdom: Animalia
- Phylum: Arthropoda
- Class: Insecta
- Order: Odonata
- Suborder: Zygoptera
- Family: Coenagrionidae
- Genus: Pyrrhosoma
- Species: P. elisabethae

Binomial name
- Pyrrhosoma elisabethae Schmidt, 1948

= Pyrrhosoma elisabethae =

Species of damselfly

Pyrrhosoma elisabethae, the Greek red damselfly, is a species of damselfly in the family Coenagrionidae. The damselfly finds its habitat in rivers. It is found in Albania and Greece. It is threatened by habitat loss.
