= Holt Copse & Joel Park =

Local Nature Reserve in Berkshire, England

Coordinates: 51°25′02″N 0°50′40″W

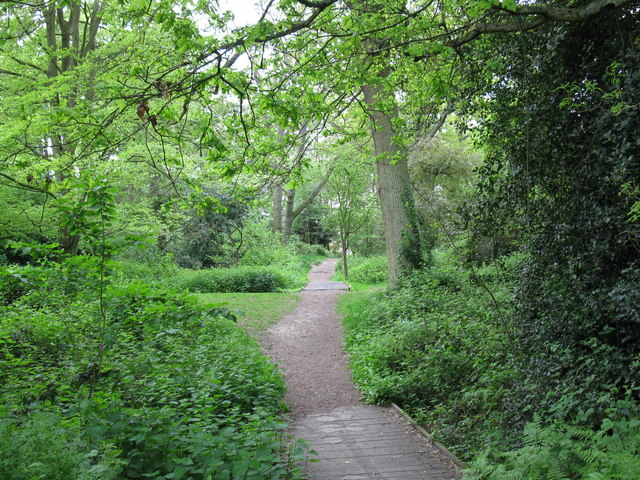
- Interactive map of Holt Copse & Joel Park
- Type: Local Nature Reserve
- Location: Wokingham, Berkshire
- OS grid: SU 804 693
- Area: 5.3 hectares (13 acres)
- Manager: Wokingham Town Council and Holt Copse Conservation Volunteers

Holt Copse & Joel Park is a 5.3-hectare (13-acre) Local Nature Reserve (LNR) in Wokingham in Berkshire. It is owned by Wokingham Town Council and managed by the council and Holt Copse Conservation Volunteers.

== Geography and site ==
The total area of the park and copse is 9.3 hectares (23 acres) in size, with the LNR being 5.2 hectares (13 acres) of this area. Holt Copse is an ancient semi-natural woodland. The copse itself is 2.7 hectares (6.7 acres) in area.

Holt Copse lies on the geological change from Bagshot beds to London Clay.

== History ==
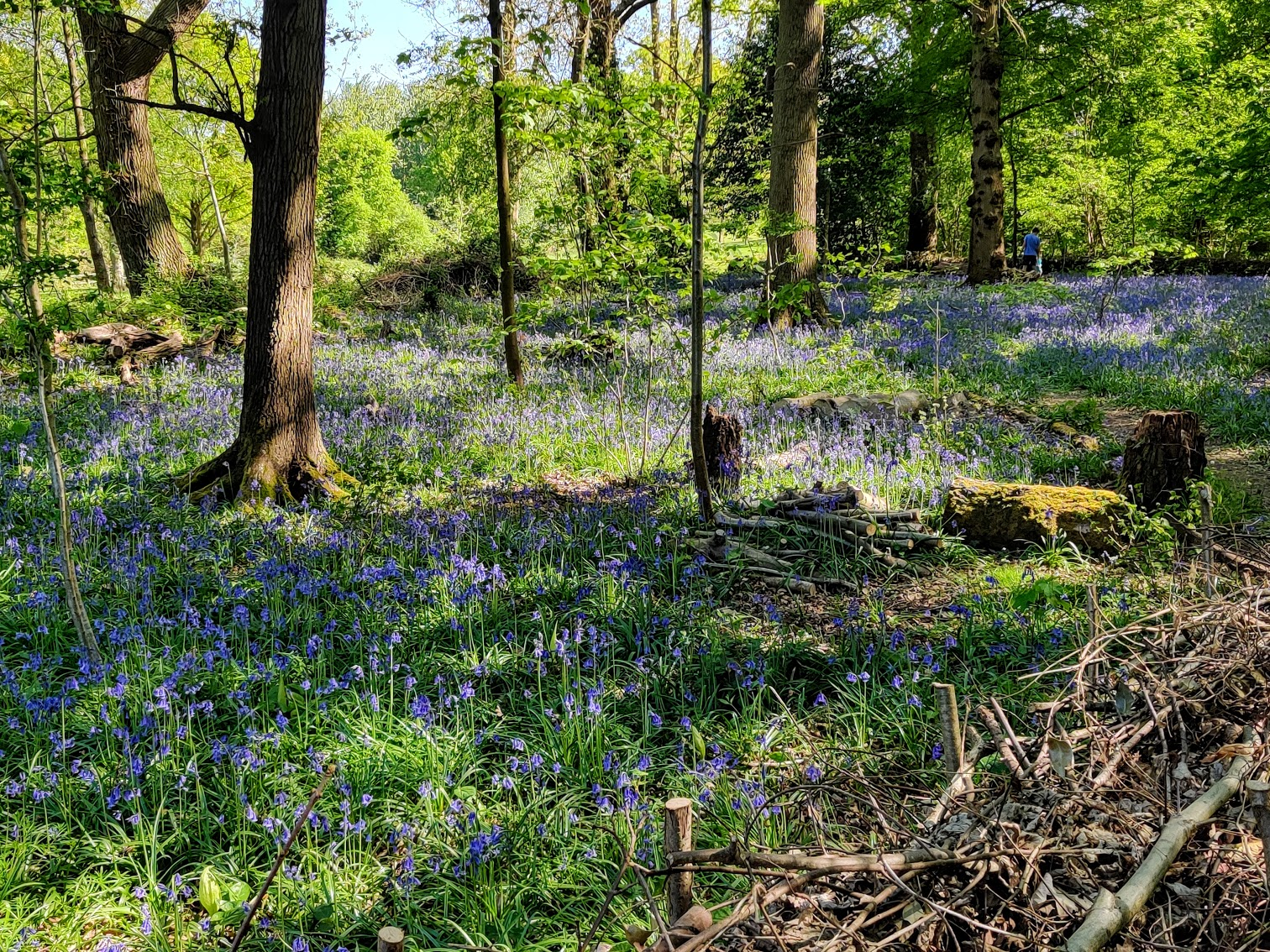
Holt Copse woodland with a Bluebell carpet

In 2002 the site was declared as a local nature reserve by Wokingham Borough Council.

== Fauna ==
The site has the following fauna:

=== Mammals ===
- Common noctule

=== Invertebrates ===
- Speckled wood

== Flora ==
The site has the following flora:

=== Trees ===
- Acer campestre
- Corylus avellana
- Ilex aquifolium
- Quercus robur
- Sorbus aucuparia

=== Plants ===
- Cardamine pratensis
- Hyacinthoides non-scripta
