= Ali's Pond Local Nature Reserve =

Nature reserve in Berkshire, England

Coordinates: 51.47036°N 0.91171°W

Ali's Pond
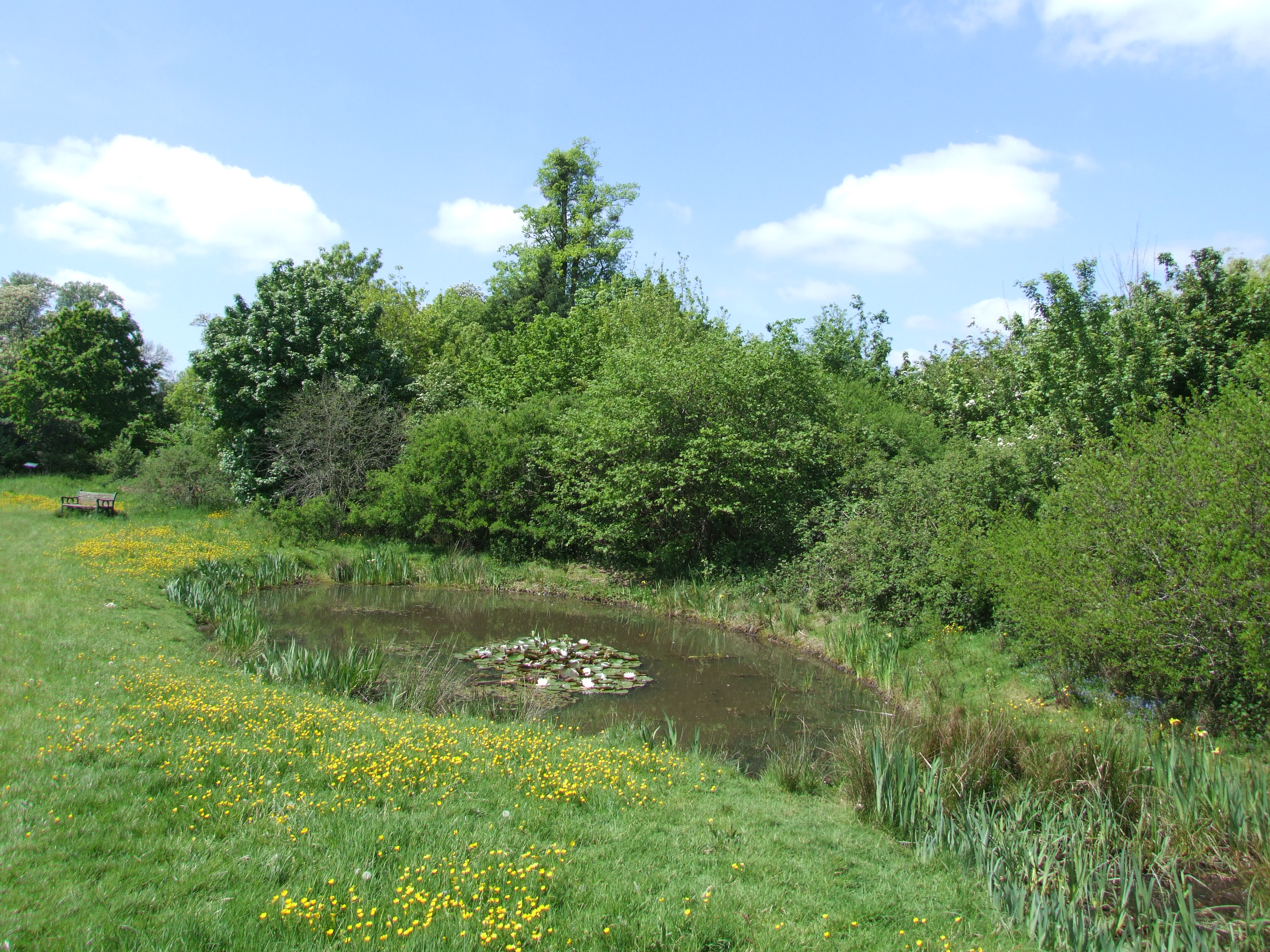
- Interactive map of Ali's Pond
- Type: Local Nature Reserve
- Location: Sonnning, Berkshire
- OS grid: SU 756 751
- Area: 0.4 hectares (0.99 acres)
- Manager: Friends of Ali’s Pond

Ali's Pond is a 0.4-hectare (0.99-acre) Local Nature Reserve in Sonning in Berkshire. It is owned by Sonning Parish Council and managed by the Friends of Ali's Pond.

The nature reserve adjoins King George's Field in Sonning. It was established in 1997 by professional ecologist and local resident Alastair Driver (hence the site's name), who acts as the voluntary warden. The area is laid out with paths and large ponds.

Following the discovery of breeding Great Crested Newts during the Millennium Festival pond-dipping sessions in the summer of 2000, an application was made to English Nature for local nature reserve status for the site. The first site management plan was produced in September 2000 and the site was officially declared Ali's Pond LNR in April 2001, making Sonning Parish Council only the third parish council in the country to declare an LNR.

The nature area has been created and managed for the use and enjoyment of all sections of the local community, as well as for visitors to the village. Key England Biodiversity Strategy priority species which have colonized the site so far include Great-crested Newt, Stag Beetle, Song Thrush and Pipistrelle Bat. In total, 19 species of dragonfly, 23 species of butterfly, over 300 species of larger moth and 45 species of aquatic/wetland plants have been recorded at the site since its establishment in 1997.

The field immediately to the south and west of Ali's Pond LNR was purchased by Reading Blue Coat School in 2006. Then, in 2007, as a condition of the planning application to change the land use designation of that field from agriculture to sport, another nature area was created within it to provide additional habitat for Great Crested Newts. This area is known as Sonning Field and contains another amphibian breeding pond, log and brushwood piles and new hedgerows with a wide variety of native trees and shrubs. Both fields are rich in wildflowers having had their nutrient levels reduced for many years through annual hay cutting and removal of arisings, supplemented with the sowing of native loamy and sandy soil wildflower mixes in 2020. A permissive path enables easy access through from Ali's Pond and across Sonning Field through to Sonning Lane.

In addition to the wholly informal use of the site, a Friends of Ali's Pond (FAP) Group has been set up which now has over 70 members, most of whom live within a couple of miles of the site. Members of this group participate in volunteer management activities such as tree planting, pond clearance and hay-making and attend moth and amphibian surveys under the guidance of the voluntary warden Alastair Driver. These activities have not been confined solely to the reserve — conservation work has also been carried out in other nearby locations to provide complementary habitat and amenity to that found in the reserve.

The Friends of Ali's Pond received the Chartered Institute of Ecology and Environmental Management 2016 Best Practice Award for Practical Nature Conservation - Small Scale.

== See also ==
- List of local nature reserves in England
