= The Gullet Local Nature Reserve =

Nature reserve in Berkshire, England

Coordinates: 51.516°N 0.733°W

The Gullet
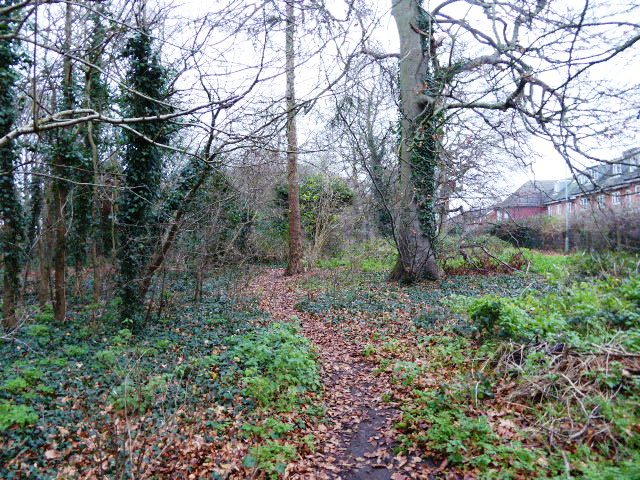
- Interactive map of The Gullet
- Type: Local Nature Reserve
- Location: Maidenhead, Berkshire
- OS grid: SU 880 804
- Area: 2.1 hectares (5.2 acres)
- Manager: Royal Borough of Windsor and Maidenhead

The Gullet is a 2.1-hectare (5.2-acre) Local Nature Reserve in Maidenhead in Berkshire. It is owned and managed by the Royal Borough of Windsor and Maidenhead.

== Geography and site ==
The nature reserve is a small strip of woodland along the railway which contains a mixture of trees on a chalky soil, along with flowering plants, scrub and rough grassland.

== History ==
In 1999 the site was declared as a local nature reserve by the Royal Borough of Windsor and Maidenhead.

== Flora ==
The site has the following flora:

=== Trees ===
- Fagus sylvatica
- Quercus robur
