= The Marshes Local Nature Reserve =

Nature reserve in Berkshire, England

Coordinates: 51.364°N 0.947°W

The Marshes
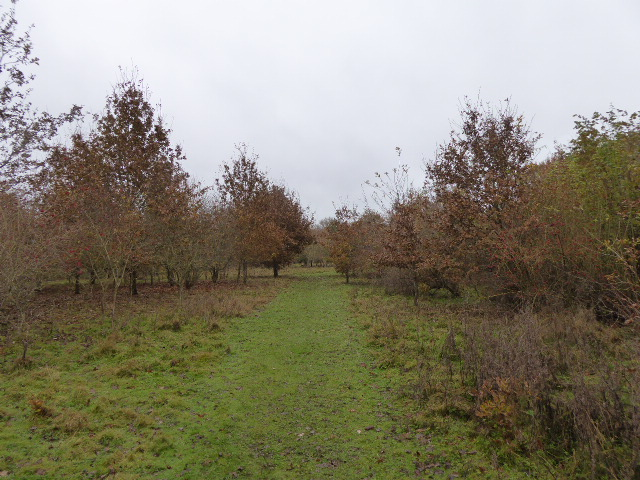
- Interactive map of The Marshes
- Type: Local Nature Reserve
- Location: Swallowfield, Berkshire
- OS grid: SU 734 633
- Area: 2.2 hectares (5.4 acres)
- Manager: Swallowfield Parish Council

The Marshes is a 2.2-hectare (5.4-acre) Local Nature Reserve south of Swallowfield in Berkshire. It is owned and managed by Swallowfield Parish Council.

The main part of this site is a former horse paddock which was planted with 1400 native shrubs and trees between 2004 and 2008. A pond and boardwalk were constructed in a small area of wet woodland.

There is access from School Road.
