= Carpenter's Wood =

Woodland near Windsor, England

Coordinates: 51.537°N 0.785°W

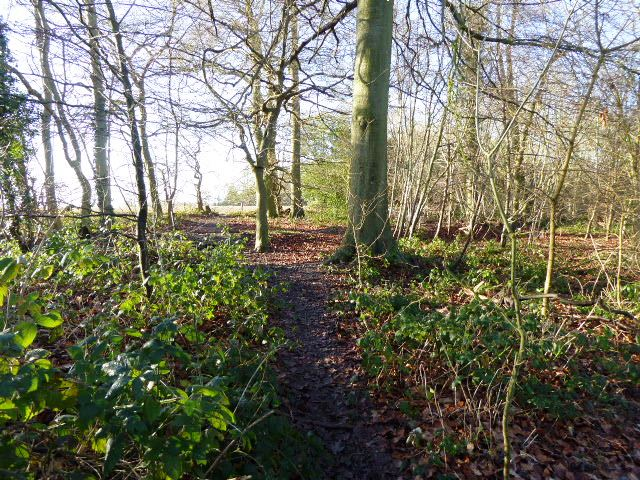
- Dungrovehill Wood
- Interactive map of Carpenter's Wood
- Type: Local Nature Reserve
- Location: Maidenhead, Berkshire
- OS grid: SU 844 827
- Area: 21.4 hectares (53 acres)
- Manager: The Woodland Trust

Carpenter's Wood is a 21.4-hectare (53-acre) Local Nature Reserve west of Maidenhead in Berkshire. It is owned by the Royal Borough of Windsor and Maidenhead and managed by The Woodland Trust.

The site consists of two adjacent woods, Carpenter's Wood and Dungrovehill Wood. It lost half of its mature beech trees in the storms of 1987 and the early 1990s.

There is access from Dungrovehill Lane.
