= Temple Copse =

Nature reserve in Berkshire, United Kingdom

Coordinates: 51.424°N 0.775°W

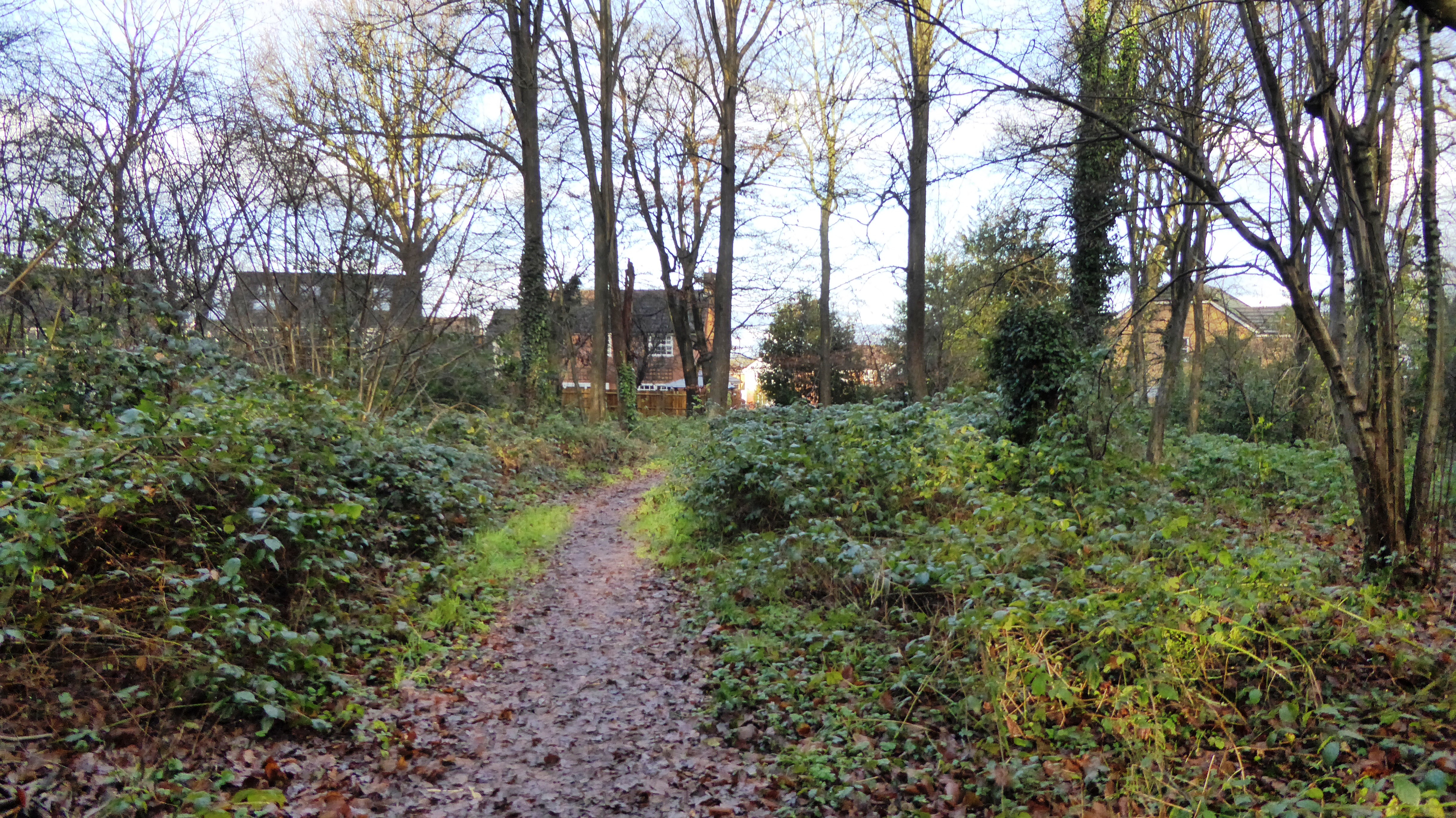
- Interactive map of Temple Copse
- Type: Local Nature Reserve
- Location: Bracknell, Berkshire
- OS grid: SU 853 702
- Area: 1.9 hectares (4.7 acres)
- Manager: Bracknell Forest Borough Council

Temple Copse is a 1.9-hectare (4.7-acre) Local Nature Reserve on the northwestern outskirts of Bracknell in Berkshire. It is owned and managed by Bracknell Forest Borough Council. Along with Jock's Copse and Tinkers Copse it forms part of what is known locally as The Three Copses.

== Geography and site ==
This site is ancient coppiced woodland, mainly oak and hazel. There is a badger run from this copse to Tinkers Copse.

== History ==
In 2002 the site was declared as a local nature reserve by Bracknell Forest Borough Council.

== Fauna ==
The site has the following fauna:

=== Mammals ===
- European badger
- Roe deer
- Wood mouse
- Eastern gray squirrel

=== Amphibians and Reptiles ===
- Grass snake

=== Birds ===
- Great spotted woodpecker
- Lesser spotted woodpecker
- European green woodpecker
- Jay
- Eurasian bullfinch
- European robin
- Eurasian blue tit

=== Invertebrates ===
- Small tortoiseshell

== Flora ==
The site has the following flora:

=== Trees ===
- Sorbus torminalis
- Quercus robur
- Corylus avellana
- Carpinus betulus

=== Plants ===
- Primula vulgaris
- Lychnis flos-cuculi
- Hyacinthoides non-scripta
