= Whitegrove Copse =

Local Nature Reserve in Berkshire, England

Coordinates: 51.423°N 0.739°W

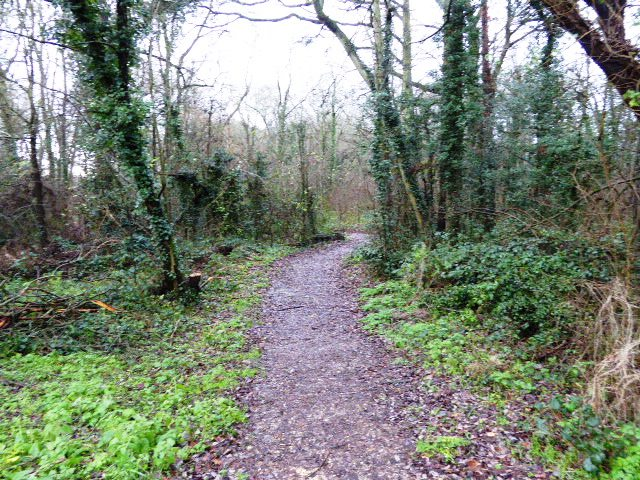
- Interactive map of Whitegrove Copse
- Type: Local Nature Reserve
- Location: Bracknell, Berkshire
- OS grid: SU 878 701
- Area: 3.6 hectares (8.9 acres)
- Manager: Bracknell Forest Borough Council

Whitegrove Copse is a 3.6-hectare (8.9-acre) Local Nature Reserve on the northern outskirts of Bracknell in Berkshire. It is owned and managed by Bracknell Forest Borough Council.

This site is ancient coppiced woodland.

== History ==
Whitegrove Copse has been wooded since at least 1600. The wood was part of the Holly Spring Estate infrastructure, providing wood and cover for deer. As part of the Holly Spring estate the site was owned in its last few years by the Sheppee family and the copse provided cover for pheasant shoots along with wood for fire logs and pea sticks within the gardens.

In the 1990s large areas of the land surrounding Whitegrove Copse was developed for housing, and the copse was retained as a public open space and managed by Bracknell Forest Borough Council from 1996.

In 2002 the site was declared as a local nature reserve by Bracknell Forest Borough Council.

== Fauna ==
The site has the following fauna:

=== Invertebrates ===
- Speckled wood
- Holly blue
- Dark bush-cricket

=== Birds ===
- Eurasian blackcap
- Common chiffchaff
- Coal tit
- Goldcrest
- Song thrush
- European green woodpecker
- Pyrrhula pyrrhula

== Flora ==
The site has the following flora:

=== Trees ===
- Douglas fir
- Scots pine
- Corylus avellana
- Malus sylvestris
- Quercus cerris
- Platanus orientalis
- Sorbus torminalis
- Sorbus aucuparia
- Sambucus nigra
- Crataegus
- Betula pendula
- Populus tremula
- Ilex aquifolium
- Ulmus laevis

=== Plants ===
- Lychnis flos-cuculi
- Hyacinthoides non-scripta
