= Piggy Wood =

Nature reserve in Berkshire, England

Coordinates: 51.428°N 0.749°W

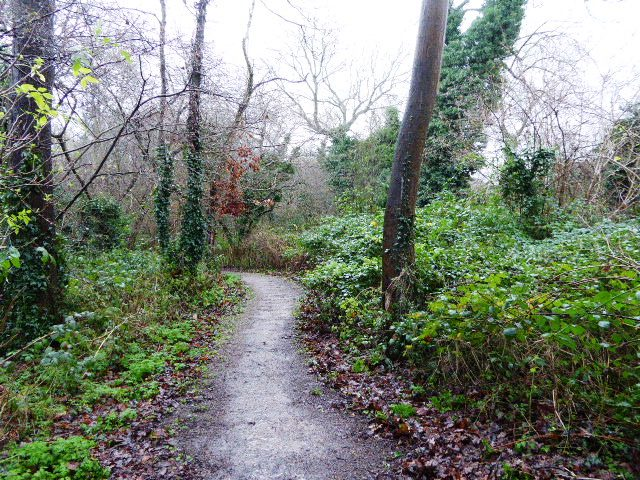
- Interactive map of Piggy Wood
- Type: Local Nature Reserve
- Location: Bracknell, Berkshire
- OS grid: SU 871 706
- Area: 2.3 hectares (5.7 acres)
- Manager: Bracknell Forest Borough Council

Piggy Wood is a 2.3-hectare (5.7-acre) Local Nature Reserve on the northern outskirts of Bracknell in Berkshire. It is owned and managed by Bracknell Forest Borough Council.

== Geography and site ==
This site is ancient woodland, with a stream that feeds The Cut. There is access from Howell Close and Newport Drive.

== History ==
The name of the site is thought to come from the time of the Reformation, where the term 'pig' was a derogatory term for a priest. To escape from persecution, priests from Hurley Church were said to have hidden in the wood.

The site was adopted by the Bracknell Forest council in 1998. In 2002 the site was declared as a local nature reserve by Bracknell Forest Borough Council.

== Flora ==
The site has the following flora:

=== Plants ===
- Geum urbanum
- Anemone nemorosa
- Hyacinthoides non-scripta
- Caltha palustris
