= Jock's Copse =

Local Nature Reserve in Berkshire, England

Coordinates: 51.425°N 0.770°W

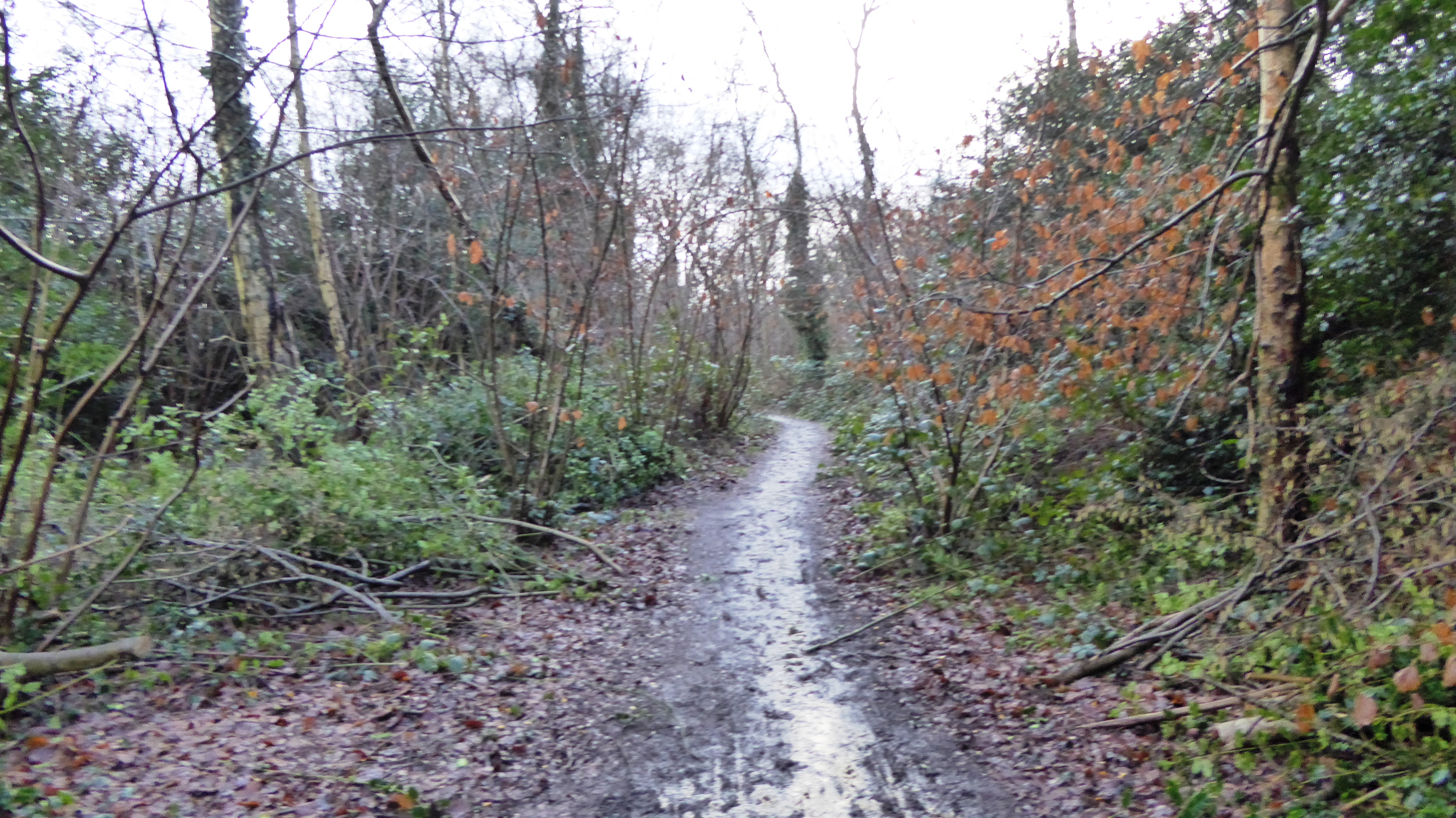
- Interactive map of Jock's Copse
- Type: Local Nature Reserve
- Location: Bracknell, Berkshire
- OS grid: SU 856 703
- Area: 1.5 hectares (3.7 acres)
- Manager: Bracknell Forest Borough Council

Jock's Copse is a 1.5-hectare (3.7-acre) Local Nature Reserve on the northern outskirts of Bracknell in Berkshire. It is owned and managed by Bracknell Forest Borough Council.

Along with Temple Copse and Tinkers Copse it forms part of what is known locally as The Three Copses. It is ancient coppiced woodland, mainly oak and hazel.

== History ==
The site was named after an itinerant Scotsman who lived in the wood in the 1800s. An old air strip prior to 1930s ran between Jock’s and Tinker's Copse.

In 2002 the site was declared as a local nature reserve by Bracknell Forest Borough Council.

== Fauna ==
The site has the following fauna:

=== Mammals ===
- European badger
- Roe deer
- Wood mouse
- Eastern gray squirrel

=== Amphibians and Reptiles ===
- Grass snake

=== Birds ===
- Great spotted woodpecker
- Lesser spotted woodpecker
- European green woodpecker
- Jay
- Eurasian bullfinch
- European robin
- Eurasian blue tit

=== Invertebrates ===
- Small tortoiseshell

== Flora ==
The site has the following flora:

=== Trees ===
- Sorbus torminalis
- Quercus robur
- Corylus avellana
- Carpinus betulus

=== Plants ===
- Primula vulgaris
- Lychnis flos-cuculi
- Hyacinthoides non-scripta
