= Grade II* listed buildings in Berkshire =

Berkshire shown within England

There are over 20,000 Grade II* listed buildings in England. This page is a list of these buildings in the county of Berkshire by district.

== Buildings ==
=== Bracknell Forest ===
Name	Location	Type	Completed (Note: The date given is the date used by Historic England as significant for the initial building or that of an important part in the structure's description.)	Date designated	Grid ref. (Note: The grid reference is based on the British national grid reference system, sometimes known as OSGB36, used by the Ordnance Survey.) Geo-coordinates	Entry number (Note: The "List Entry Number" is a unique number assigned to each listed building and scheduled monument by Historic England.)	Image
Binfield Lodge	Binfield	House	Extended and altered 1912	7 December 1966	SU8435273136; 51°27′03″N 0°47′15″W	1390315	Upload Photo
Binfield Park	Binfield	Country house	1775	7 December 1966	SU8458571621; 51°26′14″N 0°47′04″W	1390299	Binfield Park More images
Binfield Place	Binfield	House	Mid-16th century	7 December 1966	SU8403070953; 51°25′53″N 0°47′33″W	1390270	Upload Photo
Church of All Saints	Binfield	Parish church	14th century	7 December 1966	SU8454772148; 51°26′31″N 0°47′06″W	1390256	Church of All Saints More images
Wellington College, main blocks and front walls	Crowthorne	College	1856–59	20 December 1972	SU8317563408; 51°21′49″N 0°48′24″W	1390356	Wellington College, main blocks and front walls More images
Church of St Michael	Sandhurst	Parish church	1853	20 December 1972	SU8258161862; 51°20′59″N 0°48′56″W	1390382	Church of St Michael More images
Old Building with attached lamps, Royal Military Academy	Royal Military Academy, Sandhurst	Barracks	1807–12	20 December 1972	SU8585660868; 51°20′26″N 0°46′08″W	1390376	Old Building with attached lamps, Royal Military Academy More images
Church of St Michael and All Angels	Warfield	Parish church	13th century	7 December 1979	SU8800672204; 51°26′31″N 0°44′07″W	1390393	Church of St Michael and All Angels More images
Church of St Mary	Winkfield	Parish church	14th century	7 December 1966	SU9042172437; 51°26′37″N 0°42′01″W	1390428	Church of St Mary More images
New Lodge	Winkfield	Country house	c. 1857	2 May 1989	SU9118075029; 51°28′01″N 0°41′20″W	1319407	New Lodge More images

=== Reading ===
Name	Location	Type	Completed	Date designated	Grid ref. Geo-coordinates	Entry number	Image
Albion Place	Reading	Terrace	c. 1825–35	22 March 1957	SU7218872994; 51°27′05″N 0°57′45″W	1113506	Albion Place More images
Archway connecting Forbury Gardens to Reading Abbey ruins, including retaining walls flanking path to Abbey ruins	Reading	Arch	Mid-19th century	14 December 1978	SU7197073585; 51°27′24″N 0°57′56″W	1113478	Archway connecting Forbury Gardens to Reading Abbey ruins, including retaining walls flanking path to Abbey ruins More images
Chazey Farmhouse	Reading	House	Early 19th century	24 October 1951	SU6910975208; 51°28′18″N 1°00′23″W	1157139	Upload Photo
Christ Church	Reading	Anglican church	1875	14 December 1978	SU7221272175; 51°26′38″N 0°57′44″W	1113441	Christ Church More images
Church of St Mary	Reading	Church	1798	22 March 1957	SU7133473246; 51°27′13″N 0°58′29″W	1113427	Church of St Mary More images
Church of St Peter	Caversham	Church	From 12th century	22 March 1957	SU7088974892; 51°28′07″N 0°58′51″W	1303560	Church of St Peter More images
Culvert on Holy Brook running south-westwards from SU71441/73234 to 71327/73133	Reading	Culvert	Late 16th century	24 October 1984	SU7137973183; 51°27′11″N 0°58′27″W	1321866	Culvert on Holy Brook running south-westwards from SU71441/73234 to 71327/73133 More images
Holybrook House	Reading	House	c. 1750	22 March 1957	SU7118773068; 51°27′08″N 0°58′37″W	1113420	Holybrook House More images
Main block and flanking wings at Royal Berkshire Hospital	Reading	Hospital	1882	19 March 1975	SU7241272955; 51°27′03″N 0°57′34″W	1156091	Main block and flanking wings at Royal Berkshire Hospital More images
Nos. 154 to 160 (even) and railings to street	Castle Hill, Reading	House	18th century	22 March 1957	SU7085973015; 51°27′06″N 0°58′54″W	1113431	Nos. 154 to 160 (even) and railings to street More images
Old Grove House	Emmer Green, Reading	Timber-framed house	Probably early to mid-17th century	22 March 1957	SU7131876676; 51°29′04″N 0°58′28″W	1302576	Old Grove House More images
St David's Hall	Reading	Terrace	1830s	22 March 1957	SU7218572944; 51°27′03″N 0°57′45″W	1303031	St David's Hall More images
The Simeon Monument	Reading	Obelisk	1804	22 March 1957	SU7169773462; 51°27′20″N 0°58′10″W	1113534	The Simeon Monument More images
Town Council chamber and offices with clock tower	Reading	Local government office	1872–75	22 March 1957	SU7167473578; 51°27′24″N 0°58′11″W	1113400	Town Council chamber and offices with clock tower More images
Watlington House	Reading	House	Probably earlier than 1763	22 March 1957	SU7224773167; 51°27′10″N 0°57′42″W	1321898	Watlington House More images
19 Castle Street	Reading	House	Early 18th century	22 March 1957	SU7132973205; 51°27′12″N 0°58′29″W	1113414	19 Castle Street More images
78–84 Southampton Street	Reading	Terrace	1810	22 March 1957	SU7165272846; 51°27′00″N 0°58′13″W	1113584	Upload Photo
173–183 Kings Road	Reading	House	After 1832	22 March 1957	SU7250473303; 51°27′15″N 0°57′29″W	1155954	173–183 Kings Road More images
73 and 75 London Street	Reading	House	1748	22 March 1975	SU7185373036; 51°27′06″N 0°58′02″W	1156168	Upload Photo
15 Castle Street	Reading	Jettied house	16th century	22 March 1957	SU7134873216; 51°27′12″N 0°58′28″W	1303734	15 Castle Street More images
17 Castle Street	Reading	House	16th century	22 March 1957	SU7133873211; 51°27′12″N 0°58′29″W	1113413	17 Castle Street More images
Royal Berkshire Regiment Cenotaph	Reading	War memorial	1921	22 December 1975	SU6926773725; 51°27′30″N 1°00′16″W	1321912	Upload Photo

=== Slough ===
Name	Location	Type	Completed	Date designated	Grid ref. Geo-coordinates	Entry number	Image
King John's Palace	Colnbrook, Colnbrook with Poyle	Jettied house	c. 1600	11 August 1952	TQ0281876974; 51°28′57″N 0°31′15″W	1280920	King John's Palace More images
The Ostrich Public House	Colnbrook, Colnbrook with Poyle	Public house	16th century	23 September 1955	TQ0265277095; 51°29′01″N 0°31′23″W	1124367	The Ostrich Public House More images
Church of St Mary	Slough	Parish church	1876–78	29 September 1950	SU9763479581; 51°30′24″N 0°35′41″W	1321977	Church of St Mary More images
Church of St Peter	Chalvey	Church	1860–61	29 September 1950	SU9668479569; 51°30′24″N 0°36′30″W	1113376	Church of St Peter More images
Upton Court	Slough	House	17th century	29 September 1950	SU9803779058; 51°30′07″N 0°35′20″W	1251585	Upton Court
2, 4, 6, 8 St Mary's Road (Kederminster Almshouses)	Langley	Almshouse	1617	29 September 1950	TQ0047179491; 51°30′20″N 0°33′14″W	1113384	2, 4, 6, 8 St Mary's Road (Kederminster Almshouses) More images
12, 14, 16, 18, 20, 22 St Mary's Road (Seymour Almshouses)	Langley	Almshouse	1687	29 September 1950	TQ0046679595; 51°30′23″N 0°33′14″W	1113387	12, 14, 16, 18, 20, 22 St Mary's Road (Seymour Almshouses) More images

=== West Berkshire ===
Name	Location	Type	Completed	Date designated	Grid ref. Geo-coordinates	Entry number	Image
Aldermaston Court	Aldermaston	House	1636	14 April 1967	SU5965764807; 51°22′45″N 1°08′39″W	1117317	Aldermaston Court More images
North-east lodges and gates to Aldermaston Court	Aldermaston	House	c. 1636	25 October 1951	SU5913665086; 51°22′54″N 1°09′06″W	1117332	North-east lodges and gates to Aldermaston Court
Oxford Lodges to Basildon Park with gates, gatepiers and flanking walls	Basildon	Gate	1776–87	19 June 1984	SU6124478495; 51°30′07″N 1°07′09″W	1210340	Oxford Lodges to Basildon Park with gates, gatepiers and flanking walls More images
Church of St Mary the Virgin	Beech Hill	Parish church	1867	14 April 1967	SU6979764397; 51°22′28″N 0°59′55″W	1117135	Church of St Mary the Virgin More images
The Priory including adjoining wall on the north-east	Beech Hill	Country house	16th century	14 April 1947	SU7081764340; 51°22′25″N 0°59′02″W	1117130	Upload Photo
Church of St Mary	Beenham	Church	1794	14 April 1967	SU5908068480; 51°24′44″N 1°09′07″W	1303517	Church of St Mary More images
White Cottage	Beenham	House	17th century	10 November 1983	SU5972569492; 51°25′17″N 1°08′33″W	1117296	White Cottage More images
Parish church of St Andrew	Boxford	Parish church	13th century	6 April 1967	SU4287171632; 51°26′31″N 1°23′04″W	1219764	Parish church of St Andrew More images
Bradfield Hall, adjoining kitchen block and adjoining garden wall	Rotten Row, Bradfield	House	c. 1700	25 October 1951	SU5886371603; 51°26′25″N 1°09′16″W	1289492	Upload Photo
Church of St Andrew	Bradfield	Church	16th century	14 April 1967	SU6033272580; 51°26′56″N 1°08′00″W	1289580	Church of St Andrew More images
Chapel approximately 10 metres east of Manor Farmhouse	Brimpton	Chapel	c. 1100	6 April 1967	SU5582265272; 51°23′02″N 1°11′57″W	1303413	Chapel approximately 10 metres east of Manor Farmhouse More images
Church of St Mary	Marlston, Bucklebury	Church	12th century	7 December 1971	SU5290971967; 51°26′39″N 1°14′24″W	1212896	Church of St Mary More images
Marlston House and surrounding terrace	Marlston, Bucklebury	House	1895–99	29 November 1983	SU5299071882; 51°26′36″N 1°14′20″W	1212898	Marlston House and surrounding terrace More images
The Old Vicarage	Bucklebury	House	Early 18th century	25 October 1951	SU5533870868; 51°26′03″N 1°12′19″W	1212777	Upload Photo
Garston Lock at SU656708	Kennet and Avon Canal, Burghfield	Lock	Early 18th century	6 December 1990	SU6558270746; 51°25′55″N 1°03′29″W	1117125	Garston Lock at SU656708 More images
The Old Rectory	Burghfield	Country house	Late 16th century	25 October 1951	SU6659168593; 51°24′45″N 1°02′38″W	1135782	Upload Photo
Catmore Farm House	Catmore	Farmhouse	14th century	21 October 1951	SU4536380168; 51°31′07″N 1°20′51″W	1210996	Catmore Farm House More images
Barn with corn mill and attached stable forming north-east side of former farmyard at Woolley House	Woolley Park, Chaddleworth	Corn mill	Probably early 19th century	5 November 1990	SU4106080134; 51°31′07″N 1°24′35″W	1290292	Upload Photo
Woolley Park	Woolley Park, Chaddleworth	Country house	Late 17th century	25 October 1951	SU4101480060; 51°31′05″N 1°24′37″W	1290345	Woolley Park More images
Chieveley House	Chieveley	House	18th century	6 April 1967	SU4759273984; 51°27′46″N 1°18′59″W	1291142	Chieveley House More images
Church of St Mary	Chieveley	Church	13th century	6 April 1967	SU4744474096; 51°27′50″N 1°19′06″W	1220107	Church of St Mary More images
Prior's Court School	Chieveley	House	Late 18th century	6 April 1967	SU4883473677; 51°27′36″N 1°17′55″W	1291103	Prior's Court School
Garden house at Manor Farm in south-west corner of garden wall	Combe	Garden house	c. 1670	10 September 1951	SU3673860697; 51°20′39″N 1°28′26″W	1290619	Garden house at Manor Farm in south-west corner of garden wall
Wrights Farm House	Combe	Farmhouse	14th century	8 June 1984	SU3666761465; 51°21′04″N 1°28′30″W	1221121	Wrights Farm House More images
Church of St Mary and St Nicholas	Compton	Church	18th century	24 November 1966	SU5262579670; 51°30′49″N 1°14′35″W	1135775	Church of St Mary and St Nicholas More images
Church of All Saints	East Garston	Church	12th century	6 February 1982	SU3612277068; 51°29′29″N 1°28′52″W	1321874	Church of All Saints More images
Mask Cottage	East Garston	House	18th century	11 July 1983	SU3667276542; 51°29′12″N 1°28′24″W	1321873	Upload Photo
Kennet House	East Ilsley	House	Early 18th century	25 October 1951	SU4929281024; 51°31′34″N 1°17′27″W	1319564	Kennet House
Englefield House and entrance courtyard adjoining to north-east	Englefield	House	1590–1600	19 June 1984	SU6222871943; 51°26′35″N 1°06′22″W	1289194	Englefield House and entrance courtyard adjoining to north-east More images
Fawley Manor House	South Fawley	Manor house	c. 1600	25 October 1951	SU3914780105; 51°31′07″N 1°26′14″W	1210771	Fawley Manor House More images
Church of St Frideswide	Frilsham	Church	12th century	29 November 1983	SU5380473195; 51°27′19″N 1°13′37″W	1213105	Church of St Frideswide More images
Church of St Mary	Great Shefford	Church	19th century	6 February 1962	SU3801775375; 51°28′34″N 1°27′14″W	1113644	Church of St Mary More images
Manor Farmhouse	Great Shefford	Farmhouse	16th century	10 September 1951	SU3802075326; 51°28′32″N 1°27′14″W	1113648	Upload Photo
Church of St Mary	Greenham	Church	1875–76	6 April 1967	SU4859865711; 51°23′18″N 1°18′11″W	1291027	Church of St Mary More images
Greenham Lodge	Greenham	Apartment	1969	9 September 1969	SU4898765615; 51°23′15″N 1°17′51″W	1291019	Greenham Lodge
Building 50 metres north-west of Morewood House	Hampstead Marshall	Orangery	c. 1705–18	6 April 1967	SU4159166724; 51°23′53″N 1°24′13″W	1136066	Upload Photo
Church of St Mary	Hampstead Marshall	Church	14th century	6 May 1967	SU4200066746; 51°23′54″N 1°23′52″W	1117223	Church of St Mary More images
Pair of gate piers and approximately 2 metres of wall to east and west of piers on edge of Park Lane 162 metres west of entrance to churchyard	Hampstead Marshall	Gate pier	Early 18th century	6 March 1985	SU4180966703; 51°23′52″N 1°24′02″W	1117222	Pair of gate piers and approximately 2 metres of wall to east and west of piers on edge of Park Lane 162 metres west of entrance to churchyard
Lowsley Tomb, approximately 3 metres south of south wall of Church of St Mary	Hampstead Norreys	Tomb	Late 19th century	5 June 1986	SU5293676246; 51°28′58″N 1°14′21″W	1117158	Lowsley Tomb, approximately 3 metres south of south wall of Church of St Mary
Holybrook Cottage	Holybrook	House	17th century	19 June 1984	SU6703271406; 51°26′16″N 1°02′13″W	1215618	Holybrook Cottage
Chilton Lodge	Leverton, Hungerford	Country house	1890	10 September 1951	SU3296570553; 51°25′59″N 1°31′38″W	1211296	Chilton Lodge More images
Church of St Lawrence	Hungerford	Church	1816	6 February 1962	SU3341868713; 51°24′59″N 1°31′15″W	1289541	Church of St Lawrence More images
24 High Street	Hungerford	House	1951	10 September 1951	SU3376168517; 51°24′53″N 1°30′57″W	1210596	24 High Street
Church of St Michael	Lower Green, Inkpen	Church	13th century	6 February 1952	SU3577063776; 51°22′19″N 1°29′15″W	1290597	Church of St Michael More images
Inkpen House	Lower Green, Inkpen	House	1984	10 September 1951	SU3580463731; 51°22′17″N 1°29′13″W	1290598	Inkpen House More images
Kirby House	Inkpen	Country house	18th century	10 September 1951	SU3753163209; 51°22′00″N 1°27′44″W	1221220	Kirby House More images
Church of St Mary	Kintbury	Church	12th century	6 February 1962	SU3832767005; 51°24′03″N 1°27′02″W	1117242	Church of St Mary More images
Bockhampton	Lambourn	House	17th century	10 September 1951	SU3354478030; 51°30′01″N 1°31′05″W	1113654	Bockhampton
College House	Lambourn	House	18th century	10 September 1951	SU3259578809; 51°30′26″N 1°31′54″W	1136235	College House More images
Ivy House	Lambourn	House	Late 18th century	10 September 1951	SU3275178831; 51°30′27″N 1°31′46″W	1136363	Ivy House
Manor Farmhouse	Eastbury, Lambourn	Farmhouse	16th century	10 September 1951	SU3452177312; 51°29′37″N 1°30′15″W	1113661	Upload Photo
Market Cross	Lambourn	Market cross	Medieval	10 September 1951	SU3265578936; 51°30′30″N 1°31′51″W	1312843	Market Cross More images
Parsonage House	Lambourn	House	16th century	10 September 1951	SU3252778936; 51°30′30″N 1°31′58″W	1113704	Parsonage House
Pigeon House	Eastbury, Lambourn	Farmhouse	1620	10 September 1951	SU3491377076; 51°29′30″N 1°29′55″W	1136193	Pigeon House More images
The Pigeonhouse	Eastbury, Lambourn	Dovecote	Early 17th century	10 September 1951	SU3488777128; 51°29′31″N 1°29′56″W	1113675	Upload Photo
The Village Cross	Eastbury, Lambourn	Cross	15th century	10 September 1951	SU3465277225; 51°29′34″N 1°30′08″W	1113669	The Village Cross More images
21 Newbury Street	Lambourn	House	18th century	10 September 1951	SU3276578817; 51°30′26″N 1°31′45″W	1113701	21 Newbury Street
Church of St James	Leckhampstead	Church	c. 1858–60	6 April 1967	SU4393675958; 51°28′51″N 1°22′07″W	1313057	Church of St James More images
Bridge over River Kennet	Newbury	Bridge	1726	29 September 1950	SU4710567167; 51°24′06″N 1°19′27″W	1290920	Bridge over River Kennet More images
Corn Stores	Newbury	Shop	1970	29 September 1950	SU4728867144; 51°24′05″N 1°19′18″W	1211914	Corn Stores More images
Falkland Garth	Newbury	Farmhouse	17th century	29 September 1950	SU4580765024; 51°22′57″N 1°20′35″W	1290696	Falkland Garth More images
Litten Chapel (part of the Newbury Commercial School)	Newbury	School	1983	29 September 1950	SU4693866605; 51°23′48″N 1°19′36″W	1210610	Litten Chapel (part of the Newbury Commercial School) More images
Methodist Chapel	Newbury	Methodist chapel	1837–38	30 September 1977	SU4702667501; 51°24′17″N 1°19′31″W	1211202	Methodist Chapel More images
North gateway to churchyard of St Nicholas' Church adjoining Bartholomew Street	Newbury	Gate	c. 1770	10 June 1969	SU4710367115; 51°24′04″N 1°19′27″W	1291318	North gateway to churchyard of St Nicholas' Church adjoining Bartholomew Street
South gateway to churchyard of St Nicholas' Church adjoining Bartholomew Street	Newbury	Gate	c. 1770	10 June 1969	SU4709767092; 51°24′03″N 1°19′28″W	1291423	South gateway to churchyard of St Nicholas' Church adjoining Bartholomew Street
St Bartholomew's Hospital	Newbury	Almshouse	c. 1618	10 June 1969	SU4692966576; 51°23′47″N 1°19′37″W	1219550	St Bartholomew's Hospital More images
St Mary's Vicarage	Newbury	Vicarage	c. 1830	2 September 1983	SU4722167688; 51°24′23″N 1°19′21″W	1221172	St Mary's Vicarage More images
St Nicolas House	West Mills, Newbury	Town house	Early to mid-18th century	29 September 1950	SU4697967067; 51°24′03″N 1°19′34″W	1289887	St Nicolas House More images
The Chestnuts	Newbury	House	Early to mid-18th century	29 September 1950	SU4687767683; 51°24′22″N 1°19′39″W	1219909	The Chestnuts More images
Wessex Home	Newbury	Villa	Early to mid-19th century	10 June 1969	SU4686267767; 51°24′25″N 1°19′40″W	1211380	Wessex Home More images
42 Northbrook Street	Newbury	House	c. 1724	29 September 1950	SU4709467496; 51°24′16″N 1°19′28″W	1211030	42 Northbrook Street
91 and 92 Northbrook Street	Newbury	House	c. 1740	2 September 1983	SU4707867262; 51°24′09″N 1°19′29″W	1211267	91 and 92 Northbrook Street
24 Northbrook Street	Newbury	House	Early 16th century	29 September 1950	SU4711067355; 51°24′12″N 1°19′27″W	1290211	24 Northbrook Street More images
63 Cheap Street	Newbury	Town house	c. 1796	29 September 1950	SU4731266842; 51°23′55″N 1°19′17″W	1290759	63 Cheap Street
28 Bartholomew Street	Newbury	Town house	Mid-18th century	2 September 1983	SU4700766929; 51°23′58″N 1°19′32″W	1219756	28 Bartholomew Street More images
7–11 Northbrook Street	Newbury	House	c. 1669	29 September 1950	SU4711367253; 51°24′08″N 1°19′27″W	1290298	7–11 Northbrook Street
5 Wharf Street	Newbury	Town house	Early to mid-18th century	29 September 1950	SU4720967142; 51°24′05″N 1°19′22″W	1211738	5 Wharf Street
Padworth House	Padworth	House	17th century	25 October 1951	SU6132166252; 51°23′31″N 1°07′12″W	1117314	Upload Photo
Church of St James the Less	Pangbourne	Church	1718	14 April 1967	SU6342076420; 51°28′59″N 1°05′17″W	1213980	Church of St James the Less More images
Devitt House, Pangbourne College	Pangbourne	House	1897–98	19 June 1984	SU6191575545; 51°28′32″N 1°06′36″W	1213514	Devitt House, Pangbourne College
Hill House/Little Court/Pangbourne English Centre	Pangbourne	House	1971	7 December 1971	SU6310876764; 51°29′11″N 1°05′33″W	1214033	Upload Photo
The Junior School, Pangbourne College	Pangbourne	House	1901	19 June 1984	SU6155776054; 51°28′48″N 1°06′54″W	1288792	The Junior School, Pangbourne College More images
Church of St Mary	Purley on Thames	Church	1626	14 April 1967	SU6674276059; 51°28′46″N 1°02′25″W	1288375	Church of St Mary More images
Purley Hall including stable yard adjoining to east	Purley on Thames	House	1609	25 October 1951	SU6461775776; 51°28′38″N 1°04′15″W	1214696	Upload Photo
Purley Park	Purley on Thames	House	Designed 1795	25 October 1951	SU6652575857; 51°28′40″N 1°02′37″W	1288453	Purley Park
Donnington Grove	Donnington, Shaw-cum-Donnington	House	c. 1782	6 June 1952	SU4585268959; 51°25′04″N 1°20′31″W	1220450	Upload Photo
Donnington Hospital	Shaw-cum-Donnington	Courtyard	1602	6 June 1952	SU4656468593; 51°24′52″N 1°19′55″W	1290987	Donnington Hospital More images
Benham Park	Speen	Country house	1772–75	6 June 1952	SU4401167742; 51°24′25″N 1°22′07″W	1220740	Benham Park More images
Dumbledore	Jennetts Hill, Stanford Dingley	House	17th century	29 November 1983	SU5787971119; 51°26′10″N 1°10′07″W	1213110	Upload Photo
The Old Rectory	Stanford Dingley	House	c. 1720	29 November 1983	SU5748771340; 51°26′17″N 1°10′28″W	1213108	Upload Photo
Mortimer Station	Stratfield Mortimer	Railway station	1848	4 September 1975	SU6721864112; 51°22′20″N 1°02′09″W	1117145	Mortimer Station More images
Waiting room at Mortimer Station on south-west side of railway line	Stratfield Mortimer	Railway station	1848	28 January 1987	SU6722964103; 51°22′19″N 1°02′08″W	1135802	Waiting room at Mortimer Station on south-west side of railway line More images
Streatley Farmhouse	Streatley	Farmhouse	1675	29 November 1983	SU5932882000; 51°32′02″N 1°08′46″W	1213575	Upload Photo
Streatley House	Streatley	House	Late 18th century	29 November 1983	SU5936380763; 51°31′22″N 1°08′45″W	1213395	Streatley House More images
Sulham Farmhouse	Sulham	Farmhouse	c. 1580	19 June 1984	SU6444474238; 51°27′48″N 1°04′25″W	1288378	Sulham Farmhouse More images
Church of St Mary	Thatcham	Church	12th century	6 April 1967	SU5164867229; 51°24′06″N 1°15′32″W	1155799	Church of St Mary More images
Calcot Court	Calcot Park, Tilehurst	Flats	1984	25 October 1951	SU6720472275; 51°26′44″N 1°02′04″W	1215858	Calcot Court More images
Church of St Gregory	Welford	Church	Late 19th century	6 March 1985	SU4088373156; 51°27′21″N 1°24′47″W	1117225	Church of St Gregory More images
Church of St Swithin	Wickham, Welford	Church	Saxon/Anglo Saxon	6 April 1967	SU3947271520; 51°26′29″N 1°26′01″W	1319533	Church of St Swithin More images
Entrance gates, piers and railings to West Woodhay House	West Woodhay	Gate	18th century	29 October 1984	SU3860963306; 51°22′03″N 1°26′48″W	1210179	Upload Photo
Church of St James	Winterbourne	Church	12th century	6 April 1967	SU4506971939; 51°26′41″N 1°21′10″W	1221003	Church of St James More images
Hop Castle (approximately 300 metres to north-west of Penclose Farmhouse)	Winterbourne	House	1983	24 August 1978	SU4465473766; 51°27′40″N 1°21′31″W	1221027	Upload Photo
Wokefield Park	Wokefield	House	Early 18th century	14 April 1967	SU6733165687; 51°23′10″N 1°02′02″W	1135957	Wokefield Park More images
Douai Abbey Church	Upper Woolhampton	Abbey	1928–33	10 November 1983	SU5770468214; 51°24′36″N 1°10′18″W	1156252	Douai Abbey Church More images
Elstree School, Woolhampton House	Upper Woolhampton	House	17th century	9 September 1969	SU5768367525; 51°24′14″N 1°10′20″W	1117267	Elstree School, Woolhampton House
The Rectory	Upper Woolhampton	House	Early 18th century	10 November 1983	SU5748368048; 51°24′31″N 1°10′30″W	1319552	Upload Photo
Church of All Saints	Brightwalton	Church	1862	27 June 1972	SU4270679300; 51°30′40″N 1°23′10″W	1117194	Church of All Saints More images

=== Windsor and Maidenhead ===
Name	Location	Type	Completed	Date designated	Grid ref. Geo-coordinates	Entry number	Image
Church of All Saints	Bisham	Parish church	12th century	25 March 1955	SU8480985407; 51°33′40″N 0°46′41″W	1303618	Church of All Saints More images
Tithe Barn	Bisham Abbey, Bisham	Aisled barn	Late 15th century	25 March 1955	SU8464984849; 51°33′22″N 0°46′49″W	1117563	Upload Photo
Barn at Stroud Farm, approximately 35 metres east of Stroud Farmhouse	Bray	Threshing barn	15th century	2 May 1989	SU9025677600; 51°29′25″N 0°42′05″W	1136397	Upload Photo
Braywick House	Braywick, Bray	Country house	17th century	25 March 1955	SU8938479289; 51°30′20″N 0°42′49″W	1319441	Upload Photo
Church of St Michael	Bray	Parish church	c. 1300	25 March 1955	SU9016979704; 51°30′33″N 0°42′08″W	1312994	Church of St Michael More images
Lych Gate	Bray	Lych gate	Early 15th century	25 March 1955	SU9017679644; 51°30′31″N 0°42′07″W	1117492	Lych Gate More images
Oakley Court Hotel	Water Oakley, Bray	Country house	1859	21 December 1977	SU9226577626; 51°29′24″N 0°40′21″W	1117481	Oakley Court Hotel More images
Stroud Farmhouse	Bray	Farmhouse	Late 14th century	2 May 1989	SU9020677581; 51°29′24″N 0°42′08″W	1117476	Upload Photo
The Old Farmhouse	Oakley Green, Bray	Farmhouse	16th century	11 April 1972	SU9315676534; 51°28′48″N 0°39′36″W	1117496	Upload Photo
Yew Tree Cottage	Fifield, Bray	House	Late 16th century	11 April 1972	SU9037776757; 51°28′57″N 0°42′00″W	1312986	Upload Photo
Church Gate House	Cookham	House	Late 14th century	25 March 1955	SU8971285443; 51°33′39″N 0°42′26″W	1303445	Church Gate House
Church of Holy Trinity	Cookham	Parish church	12th century	25 March 1955	SU8970585513; 51°33′41″N 0°42′26″W	1117568	Church of Holy Trinity More images
Noah's House Boathouse	Cookham	Boat house	1930	15 April 1998	SU8775586895; 51°34′27″N 0°44′06″W	1323741	Upload Photo
Tarrystone House, including iron gates and gate piers and adjoining wall	Cookham	House	Early 18th century	25 March 1955	SU8975285369; 51°33′36″N 0°42′24″W	1319371	Tarrystone House, including iron gates and gate piers and adjoining wall
Bell Farm Farmhouse	Eton Wick, Eton	Farmhouse	c. 1375	11 April 1950	SU9487778758; 51°29′59″N 0°38′04″W	1210944	Upload Photo
Lower Chapel, Eton College	Eton	School	1889–91	11 April 1950	SU9650077783; 51°29′27″N 0°36′41″W	1290001	Upload Photo
St Christopher's	Eton	House	18th century	11 April 1950	SU9663577800; 51°29′27″N 0°36′34″W	1210908	St Christopher's
Statue of Henry VI, Eton College	Eton	Statue	1718	14 May 1973	SU9669977910; 51°29′31″N 0°36′31″W	1210902	Statue of Henry VI, Eton College More images
The Cock Pitt Cafe	Eton	House	15th century	4 November 1950	SU9669077411; 51°29′15″N 0°36′32″W	1290036	The Cock Pitt Cafe More images
42 High Street	Eton	House	18th century	4 November 1950	SU9668577462; 51°29′16″N 0°36′32″W	1211362	42 High Street
Barn at Hurley Farm	Hurley	Barn	Reroofed in 16th century	25 March 1955	SU8256783984; 51°32′55″N 0°48′38″W	1319423	Barn at Hurley Farm More images
Church of St Mary	Hurley	Church	15th century	25 March 1955	SU8258884073; 51°32′58″N 0°48′37″W	1117524	Church of St Mary More images
The Cloisters	Hurley	House	20th century	23 March 1955	SU8259884083; 51°32′59″N 0°48′37″W	1117523	The Cloisters More images
The Gate House and archway	Hurley	House	20th century	11 April 1972	SU8256284088; 51°32′59″N 0°48′38″W	1117561	The Gate House and archway
The Refectory	Hurley	House	16th century	25 March 1955	SU8259084102; 51°32′59″N 0°48′37″W	1156408	The Refectory More images
The Olde Bell	Hurley	Cross wing house	Late 15th century	25 March 1955	SU8261883708; 51°32′46″N 0°48′36″W	1156153	The Olde Bell More images
Beaumont College	Old Windsor	Country house	1705	10 August 1951	SU9900273251; 51°26′59″N 0°34′36″W	1119795	Beaumont College More images
Church of St Peter and St Andrew	Old Windsor	Parish church	Early 13th century	10 August 1951	SU9925574644; 51°27′43″N 0°34′22″W	1119805	Church of St Peter and St Andrew More images
The Priory	Old Windsor	House	Mid-18th century	3 March 1972	SU9921374505; 51°27′39″N 0°34′24″W	1119806	Upload Photo
War memorial at Beaumont College approximately 45 metres from north west corner of main building	Old Windsor	War memorial	c. 1920	26 June 1998	SU9890973252; 51°26′59″N 0°34′41″W	1119797	War memorial at Beaumont College approximately 45 metres from north west corner of main building More images
Shottesbrooke Park	Shottesbrooke	Country house	Late 16th century	11 April 1972	SU8407977212; 51°29′15″N 0°47′26″W	1117448	Shottesbrooke Park More images
Church of All Souls	South Ascot, Sunninghill and Ascot	Church	1896–97	3 March 1972	SU9228268001; 51°24′13″N 0°40′29″W	1119809	Church of All Souls More images
Bell Inn	Waltham St Lawrence	Inn	c. 1400	25 March 1955	SU8296876910; 51°29′06″N 0°48′23″W	1135882	Bell Inn More images
Church of St Lawrence	Waltham St Lawrence	Church	11th century	25 March 1955	SU8295076971; 51°29′08″N 0°48′24″W	1117515	Church of St Lawrence More images
Goosenest Farmhouse	West End, Waltham St Lawrence	Aisled house	Early 14th century	1 March 1988	SU8242775109; 51°28′08″N 0°48′53″W	1117503	Upload Photo
Kellinghams	Waltham St Lawrence	House	16th century	25 March 1955	SU8309276534; 51°28′54″N 0°48′17″W	1135894	Upload Photo
Church of St Mary	White Waltham	Parish church	12th century	11 April 1972	SU8547977517; 51°29′25″N 0°46′13″W	1117451	Church of St Mary More images
Church of St Andrew	Wraysbury	Parish church	13th century	23 September 1955	TQ0012573942; 51°27′20″N 0°33′37″W	1117606	Church of St Andrew More images
King John's Hunting Lodge	Wraysbury	Timber-framed house	Late 15th or early 16th century	23 September 1955	SU9963874530; 51°27′40″N 0°34′02″W	1135976	Upload Photo
1881 Chapel at Convent of St John the Baptist	Clewer	Anglican church	1881	2 October 1975	SU9519176180; 51°28′36″N 0°37′51″W	1380282	Upload Photo
Adelaide Cottage	Home Park, Windsor	Lodge	Re-erected 1831	2 October 1975	SU9798876512; 51°28′45″N 0°35′25″W	1319270	Adelaide Cottage More images
All Saints Cottage	Boyn Hill, Maidenhead	House	1854–57	24 July 1970	SU8776580831; 51°31′11″N 0°44′11″W	1117615	Upload Photo
Ann Foorde's House	Windsor	House	18th century	4 January 1950	SU9699876643; 51°28′50″N 0°36′17″W	1205343	Ann Foorde's House More images
Church of St John the Baptist	Windsor	Church	1820–22	4 January 1950	SU9688076793; 51°28′54″N 0°36′22″W	1117708	Church of St John the Baptist More images
Church Rooms	Windsor	Jettied house	16th century	4 January 1950	SU9687076839; 51°28′56″N 0°36′23″W	1281315	Church Rooms
Cranbourne Tower	Cranbourne	Tower	Late 18th-century alterations	2 October 1975	SU9432073120; 51°26′57″N 0°38′39″W	1319295	Cranbourne Tower More images
Dial House	Windsor	House	Late 18th century	4 January 1950	SU9699176647; 51°28′50″N 0°36′17″W	1117728	Dial House
Edgeworth House Youth Hostel Association	Clewer	House	1707	2 October 1975	SU9550877100; 51°29′05″N 0°37′33″W	1117723	Upload Photo
Gothic Ruin of temple by lake in Frogmore Gardens	Home Park, Windsor	Garden house	c. 1792	2 October 1975	SU9758676074; 51°28′31″N 0°35′47″W	1319305	Gothic Ruin of temple by lake in Frogmore Gardens More images
No. 4 with entrance to Black Lion Yard	Windsor	House	Late 18th century	4 January 1950	SU9700676638; 51°28′49″N 0°36′16″W	1319319	No. 4 with entrance to Black Lion Yard More images
Old Bank House (brewery office)	Windsor	Brewery	Late 18th or early 19th century	4 January 1950	SU9682277117; 51°29′05″N 0°36′25″W	1117676	Old Bank House (brewery office)
Oldfield Lodge	Maidenhead	House	Late 18th century	27 February 1950	SU8994681291; 51°31′24″N 0°42′18″W	1117620	Oldfield Lodge More images
Parish Centre	Boyn Hill, Maidenhead	Parish hall	1983	24 July 1970	SU8774880829; 51°31′10″N 0°44′12″W	1312975	Upload Photo
Prince Albert's Dairy and Cottage	Home Park, Windsor	House	c. 1830–40	2 October 1975	SU9790275995; 51°28′28″N 0°35′30″W	1272281	Upload Photo
Railway bridge carrying the Windsor–Slough line over the Thames	Windsor	Railway bridge	1849	2 October 1975	SU9605377289; 51°29′11″N 0°37′05″W	1319297	Railway bridge carrying the Windsor–Slough line over the Thames More images
Smythes Almshouses	Maidenhead	Almshouses	1659	27 February 1950	SU8948381336; 51°31′26″N 0°42′42″W	1136053	Smythes Almshouses More images
St George's School	Windsor	School	1803	4 January 1975	SU9690677209; 51°29′08″N 0°36′21″W	1319325	St George's School More images
St Leonards Dale	Windsor	House	1700–20	4 January 1950	SU9455675139; 51°28′02″N 0°38′25″W	1319329	Upload Photo
The Gate House	Windsor	House	18th century	4 January 1950	SU9701876631; 51°28′49″N 0°36′16″W	1280766	The Gate House
The Limes	Clewer	House	17th century	2 October 1975	SU9551277142; 51°29′07″N 0°37′33″W	1117722	The Limes More images
The Old House Hotel	Windsor	House	Dated 1676	4 January 1950	SU9674077189; 51°29′07″N 0°36′29″W	1319337	The Old House Hotel More images
The Vicarage	Boyn Hill, Maidenhead	House	1854–57	24 July 1970	SU8777580859; 51°31′11″N 0°44′11″W	1117617	The Vicarage More images
Vicarage Cottage	Boyn Hill, Maidenhead	House	1857–57	12 August 1983	SU8777480846; 51°31′11″N 0°44′11″W	1136003	Upload Photo
9–11 Park Street	Windsor	House	Early 19th century	4 January 1950	SU9695576663; 51°28′50″N 0°36′19″W	1117729	9–11 Park Street More images
20 Park Street	Windsor	House	Late 18th century	2 October 1975	SU9696076699; 51°28′51″N 0°36′18″W	1117730	20 Park Street
4 and 6 Church Street	Windsor	House	1640	4 January 1950	SU9686376852; 51°28′56″N 0°36′23″W	1221042	4 and 6 Church Street
12–16 Park Street	Windsor	Terrace	Early 19th century	4 January 1950	SU9693276676; 51°28′51″N 0°36′20″W	1280741	12–16 Park Street More images

=== Wokingham ===
Name	Location	Type	Completed	Date designated	Grid ref. Geo-coordinates	Entry number	Image
Bartlett's Farmhouse	Arborfield and Newland	Farmhouse	Late 16th century	26 January 1967	SU7528466177; 51°23′23″N 0°55′10″W	1319119	Bartlett's Farmhouse
Bearwood House (now Reddam House, Berkshire - school)	Sindlesham	Country house	1865–74	14 October 1986	SU7770569052; 51°24′55″N 0°53′02″W	1135967	Bearwood House (now Reddam House, Berkshire - school) More images
Foxhill House	Whiteknights Park, Earley	House	1868	19 September 1983	SU7362872333; 51°26′43″N 0°56′31″W	1136050	Foxhill House More images
Banisters	Finchampstead	Farmhouse	16th century	26 January 1967	SU7763463087; 51°21′42″N 0°53′11″W	1319143	Upload Photo
Culham Court	Culham, Remenham	Country house	1771	1 August 1952	SU7892983800; 51°32′51″N 0°51′47″W	1118167	Culham Court More images
Hartley Court	Great Lea Common, Shinfield	Country house	Early 16th century	26 January 1967	SU7055368935; 51°24′54″N 0°59′13″W	1319124	Hartley Court
Church of St Andrew	Sonning	Church	Originally Norman	26 January 1967	SU7558875571; 51°28′27″N 0°54′47″W	1135979	Church of St Andrew More images
The Bull Hotel	Sonning	Inn	Late 16th century	26 January 1967	SU7567375521; 51°28′25″N 0°54′43″W	1117462	The Bull Hotel More images
Haineshill	St. Nicholas, Hurst	Country house	Late 16th century	1 August 1952	SU8123674080; 51°27′36″N 0°49′56″W	1117416	Upload Photo
Hinton House	St. Nicholas, Hurst	House	Late 16th century	1 August 1952	SU8037974773; 51°27′58″N 0°50′39″W	1117407	Upload Photo
Hurst Lodge	St. Nicholas, Hurst	Country house	Early 17th century	1 August 1952	SU8007373718; 51°27′24″N 0°50′56″W	1117439	Upload Photo
Barn approximately 80 metres north of Sheepbridge Court	Sheep Bridge, Swallowfield	Aisled barn	Late 16th century	14 February 1986	SU7209265497; 51°23′02″N 0°57′56″W	1135822	Upload Photo
Hall's Farm Kennels	Swallowfield	Farmhouse	Late 16th century	26 January 1967	SU7597464470; 51°22′27″N 0°54′36″W	1319167	Upload Photo
Sheepbridge Court	Sheep Bridge, Swallowfield	Farmhouse	Late 16th century	1 August 1952	SU7202965515; 51°23′03″N 0°57′59″W	1313105	Upload Photo
Swallowfield Park and adjoining stable block	Swallowfield	Country house	Late 16th and 17th century	1 August 1952	SU7311965516; 51°23′02″N 0°57′02″W	1313056	Swallowfield Park and adjoining stable block More images
The Harrison Almshouses	Twyford	Almshouse	1640	1 August 1952	SU7887476029; 51°28′40″N 0°51′56″W	1118152	Upload Photo
Bear Place	Kiln Green, Wargrave	Country house	Late 18th century	26 January 1967	SU8104479114; 51°30′19″N 0°50′01″W	1118177	Bear Place More images
Church of St Mary	Wargrave	Church	1635	26 January 1967	SU7827678469; 51°29′59″N 0°52′25″W	1155023	Church of St Mary More images
Hannen Columbarium, 22 metres south-east of Church of St Mary	Wargrave	Mausoleum	1906–07	23 December 1983	SU7830078438; 51°29′58″N 0°52′24″W	1155027	Hannen Columbarium, 22 metres south-east of Church of St Mary More images
Ashridge Farmhouse	Wokingham	Farmhouse	Late 16th century	12 November 1951	SU8137669727; 51°25′15″N 0°49′52″W	1319183	Upload Photo
Church of All Saints	Wokingham	Parish church	Late 14th century	12 November 1951	SU8152368801; 51°24′45″N 0°49′45″W	1155959	Church of All Saints More images
Church of St Paul	Wokingham	Parish church	1862–64	12 November 1951	SU8052468983; 51°24′51″N 0°50′37″W	1303384	Church of St Paul More images
Montague House and attached garden walls	Wokingham	Town house	Mid-18th century	12 November 1951	SU8109468695; 51°24′41″N 0°50′07″W	1319160	Montague House and attached garden walls More images
Outbuildings at Lucas Hospital	Chapel Green, Wokingham	Almshouse	19th century	15 July 1987	SU8125067405; 51°24′00″N 0°50′00″W	1118047	Outbuildings at Lucas Hospital
Red Lion Public House	Wokingham	House	Early 17th century	2 October 1969	SU8121268515; 51°24′35″N 0°50′01″W	1118018	Red Lion Public House More images
Shute End House	Wokingham	Town house	17th century	12 November 1951	SU8095868721; 51°24′42″N 0°50′14″W	1118009	Shute End House
The Elms	Wokingham	Town house	16th century or earlier	12 November 1951	SU8104668659; 51°24′40″N 0°50′10″W	1118045	The Elms More images
The Town Hall	Wokingham	Town hall	1860–1905	2 October 1969	SU8121168561; 51°24′37″N 0°50′01″W	1303481	The Town Hall More images
Tudor House	Wokingham	House	Late 16th century	12 November 1951	SU8099868738; 51°24′43″N 0°50′12″W	1319161	Tudor House More images
Littlecourt (W.A.D.E. Day Centre)	Wokingham	House	18th century	12 November 1951	SU8068068884; 51°24′48″N 0°50′29″W	1118028	Upload Photo
6 Market Place	Wokingham	Town house	Mid-18th century	12 November 1951	SU8117068564; 51°24′37″N 0°50′04″W	1118021	6 Market Place
6 Shute End	Wokingham	Timber-framed house	16th century	12 November 1951	SU8097668709; 51°24′42″N 0°50′13″W	1303232	6 Shute End
33 Rose Street	Wokingham	House	Late 15th century	12 November 1951	SU8137468733; 51°24′42″N 0°49′53″W	1319178	33 Rose Street
35 and 35a Rose Street	Wokingham	House	Mid-15th century	12 November 1951	SU8137868734; 51°24′42″N 0°49′53″W	1118002	Upload Photo
80 Rose Street	Wokingham	House	17th century	2 October 1969	SU8141668792; 51°24′44″N 0°49′51″W	1155568	Upload Photo
37 Rose Street	Wokingham	House	Mid-15th century	12 November 1951	SU8138468740; 51°24′43″N 0°49′52″W	1303276	Upload Photo
39 Rose Street	Wokingham	House	Late 15th century	12 November 1951	SU8139468744; 51°24′43″N 0°49′52″W	1118003	39 Rose Street
Lock's House	Wokingham Without	House	Early 18th century	26 August 1967	SU8335967727; 51°24′09″N 0°48′11″W	1118082	Lock's House
Bulmershe Manor	Woodley	House	Late 16th century	1 August 1952	SU7559473739; 51°27′27″N 0°54′48″W	1312868	Upload Photo
Church of St John the Evangelist	Woodley	Parish church	1873	26 January 1967	SU7683973692; 51°27′25″N 0°53′44″W	1136276	Church of St John the Evangelist More images

== See also ==
- Grade I listed buildings in Berkshire
