= George Webb =

George Webb may refer to:

- George Webb (bishop) (1594–1642), Anglican bishop in Ireland
- George James Webb (1803–1887), British-American composer
- George Webb (judge) (1828–1891), judge of the Supreme Court of Victoria
- George William Webb (1853–1936), Scottish born architect
- George Webb (politician) (1886–1958), member of Canadian Parliament
- George A. J. Webb (1861–1949), Australian portrait painter
- George C. Webb, American art director
- George Webb (actor) (1912–1998), English actor
- George Webb (American actor) (1887–1943)
- George Webb (musician) (1917–2010), British jazz musician

== Sportspeople ==
- George Webb (cricketer) (1857–1931), English cricketer
- George Webb (footballer, born 1888) (c. 1888–1915), English international football player for West Ham United
- George Webb (footballer, born 1991), English football player for Bournemouth

== See also ==
- George Webb Restaurants, a Wisconsin restaurant chain
- George Webbe (disambiguation)
