= Cranbourne =

Cranbourne may refer to:

== Places ==
=== Australia ===
- Cranbourne, Victoria, Australia
  - Cranbourne railway line
    - Cranbourne railway station
- Electoral district of Cranbourne, an electoral district in Victoria, Australia

=== Canada ===
- Saint-Odilon-de-Cranbourne, Quebec, Canada

=== UK ===
- Cranborne, Dorset, England, UK
- Cranborne Chase, Dorset, England, UK
- Cranbourne, Berkshire, England, UK
- Cranbourne Chase, Berkshire, England, UK
  - Cranbourne Lodge, a royal lodge, within Cranbourne Chase

== Other uses ==
- Viscount Cranbourne
- Cranbourne School, Hampshire, England, UK
- Cranbourne meteorite, 13 meteorite fragments found near Cranbourne, Victoria, also known as Cranbourne 1, 2, 3, etc.

== See also ==
- Cranbourne South, Victoria, Australia
- Cranbourne North, Victoria, Australia
- Cranbourne East, Victoria, Australia
  - Cranbourne East railway station
