= Albion Terrace =

Albion Terrace may refer to:

- Albion Terrace, Evansville, a housing unit in the US city of Evansville, Indiana
- Albion Terrace, Reading, a residential terrace in the English city of Reading
