= Binfield Park =

Listed country house in Berkshire, England

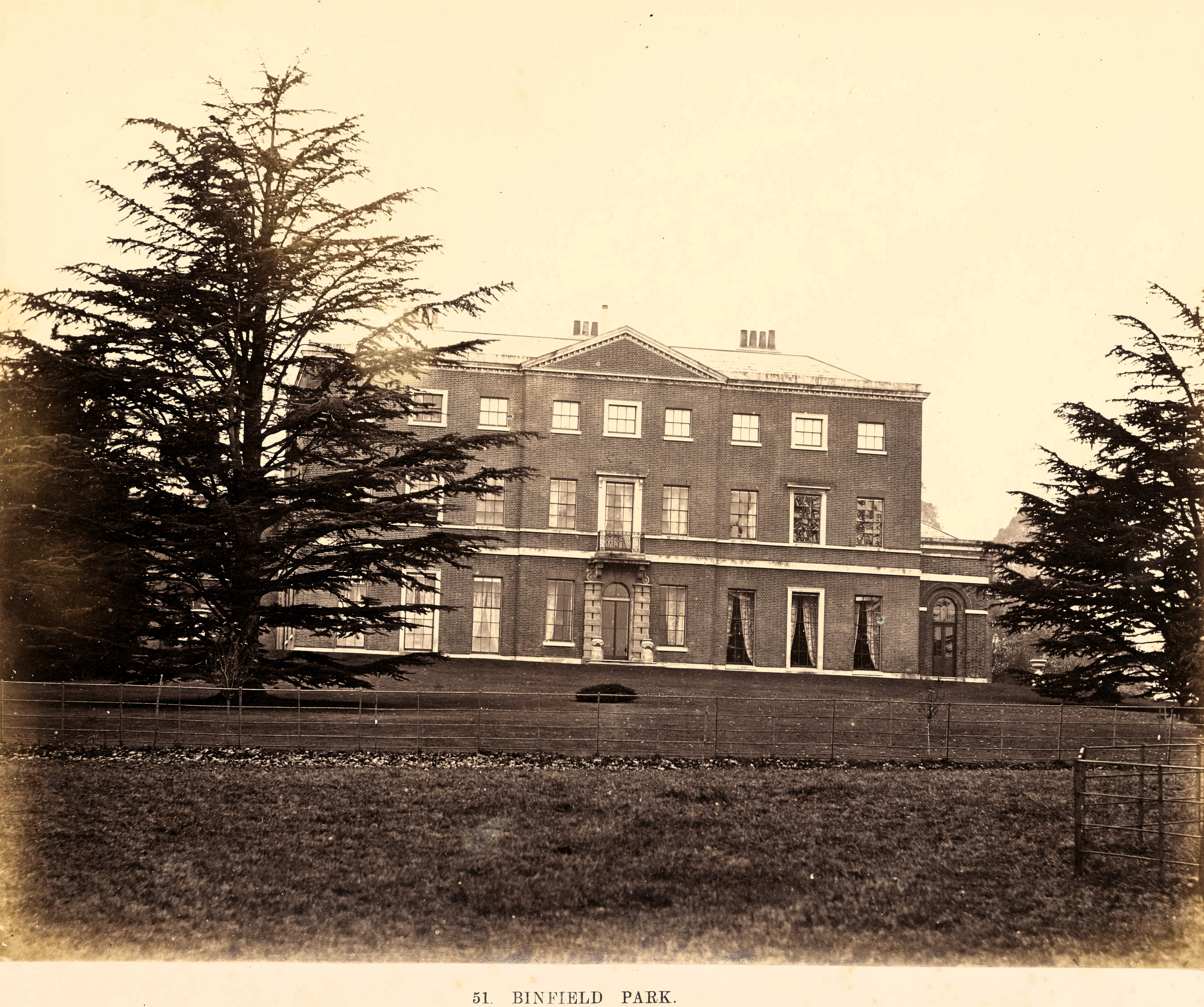
- East Front, Binfield Park, 1866

- Location within Berkshire Location within England
- 51°26′14″N 0°47′04″W
- Type: Country house
- Location: Binfield, Berkshire, England
- OS grid reference: SU 84585 71621

History
- Built: 1775

Site notes
- Architectural style: Georgian
- Website: www.binfieldpark.co.uk

Listed Building – Grade II*
- Official name: Binfield Park
- Designated: 7 December 1966; 59 years ago
- Reference no.: 1390299

Listed Building – Grade II
- Official name: Gates and piers at west entrance to Binfield Park
- Designated: 20 December 1972; 53 years ago
- Reference no.: 1390300

Listed Building – Grade II
- Official name: Gate piers at south entrance to Binfield Park
- Designated: 20 December 1972; 53 years ago
- Reference no.: 1390301

Listed Building – Grade II
- Official name: South Lodge
- Designated: 7 December 1966; 59 years ago
- Reference no.: 1390313

Binfield Park is an English country house. It is a historic Grade II* listed building. The house is located just northeast of Binfield, Berkshire.

== History ==
The house was built in 1775 by Onesiphorus Elliott. It was purchased from the Elliott family in 1854 by Florance Thomas Young. The Young family are memorialised in a Grade II listed monument in the graveyard of All Saints Church, just north of the house.

During the Second World War, the house was converted into a military hospital.

From 1949 to 2000, the property was an NHS hospital for mentally handicapped children, and during that time was called "Binfield Park Hospital". Juliette Alvin did work on music therapy there in the 1960s.

After the hospital closed, the house was converted into three individual dwellings: "The Georgian House" (the main house), "The Hall" (the north wing), and "The Manor" (the south wing).

The property is available for rental.

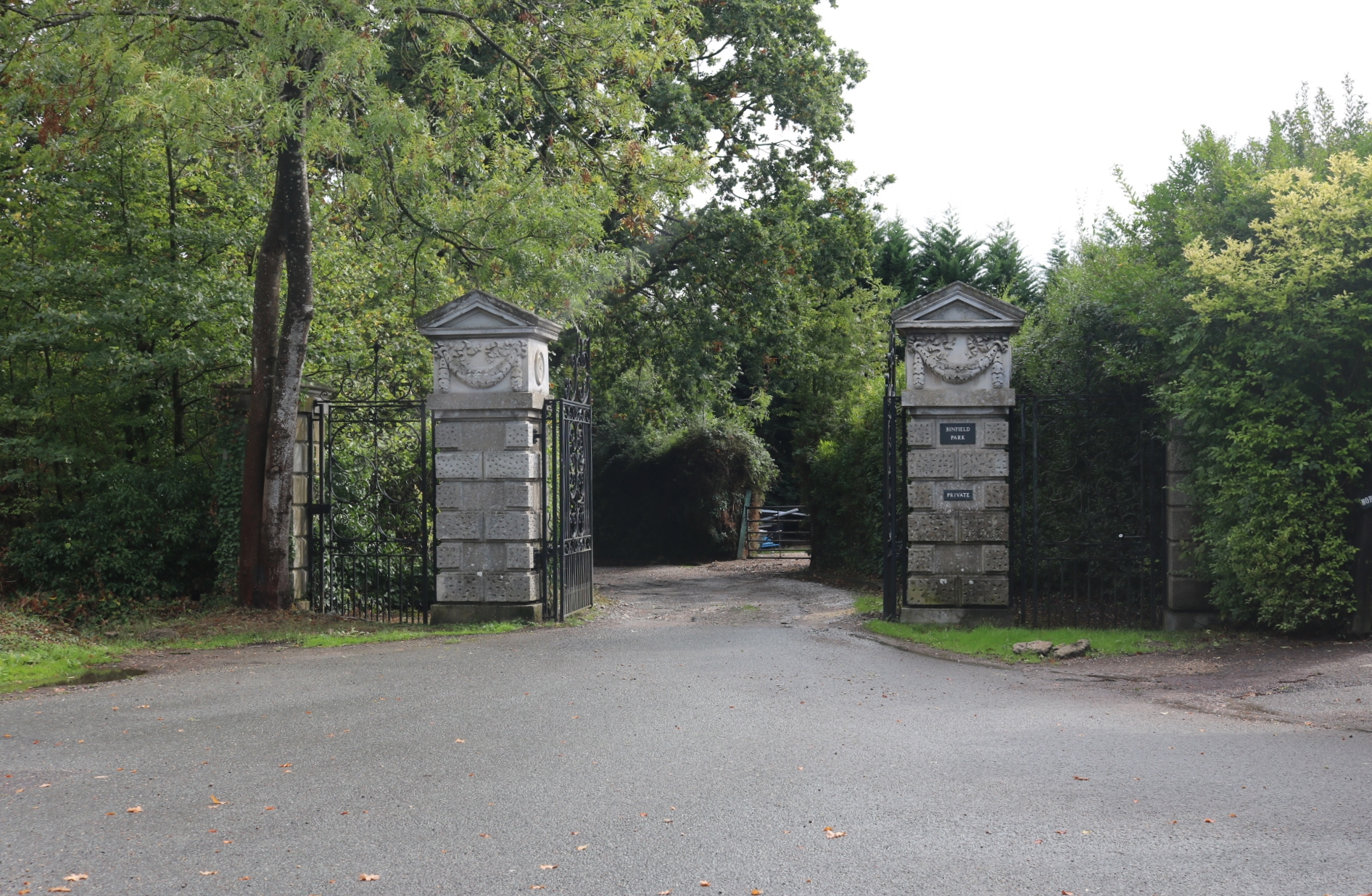
West Entrance, Binfield Park

== Architecture ==
Situated on high ground with extensive views of the surrounding country, the house has a classical design in Flemish bond red brick. The "featureless" three-storey front is abutted by projecting two-storey wings.

The interior contains "Adamesque" plasterwork.

George William Webb designed additions to the house in 1889. There were many modern additions made to the house during its institutional use; these have been removed.

The western and southern entrances to the property are both flanked by Grade II listed late 18th-century rusticated gate piers, with pediments, wreaths, and other detailing.

Likely built prior to Binfield Park and then adopted for use as a gatehouse, the early 18th-century South Lodge is also a Grade II listed building. It is now a private house.

== See also ==
- Grade II* listed buildings in Berkshire
