= Braywick House =

Listed country house in Berkshire, England

- Location within Berkshire
- Former names: Braywick Grove

General information
- Status: Used as offices
- Type: Country house
- Architectural style: Queen Anne and Georgian
- Location: Braywick, Berkshire, England
- Coordinates: 51°30′19″N 0°42′47″W
- Year built: 1675
- Client: Sir William Paule

Listed Building – Grade II*
- Official name: Braywick House
- Designated: 25 March 1955; 71 years ago
- Reference no.: 1319441

Braywick House, for most of its history called "Braywick Grove", is an English country house now converted to offices. It is a historic Grade II* listed building located in Braywick, Berkshire, a suburb south of Maidenhead.

== History ==
Braywick House was built in 1675 for Sir William Paule (also spelled Paul and Paull) (c. 1632–1685), Paule was the son of Dr. William Paul, Bishop of Oxford (1599–1665).

He died childless, so when his widow Mary (later Lady Penyston, second wife of Sir Fairmeadow Penyston, the last of the Penyston baronets, of Leigh), died in 1714, the house reverted to the family of William's brother James, which at that point consisted only of James' granddaughter Catherine (d. 1753). In 1724 she married Sir William Stapleton, 4th Stapleton Baronet (1698–1740). While they maintained ownership of Braywick, the Stapleton family's primary residence was at Greys Court, nearby in Oxfordshire, which Catherine had also inherited.

In around 1783, the house was acquired by the Hon. Thomas Windsor (1752–1832), the second son of Other Windsor, 4th Earl of Plymouth. A former Royal Navy Captain, Thomas Windsor had made his fortune by capturing Spanish ships in the Caribbean. In 1802 while living in Braywick, he was High Sheriff of Berkshire. According to subsequent descriptions of the property, he enlarged and remodelled the house in the then-current Georgian style.

The house was sold in c. 1808 to captain, later Major-General, Sir Thomas Anburey (1759–1849). Anburey then listed Braywick for sale when he was sent to India in 1818. He would go on to lead the Bengal Sappers and Miners in Allahabad.

In 1833 William Atkins-Bowyer (1779–1844) is listed as residing at the property.

By 1839 the home was owned by Richard Boucher (sometimes spelled Bouchier) (1754–1841) who was vicar of Brightwalton in Berkshire for 53 years between 1788 and 1841. And in 1842 Richard's widow, Rebecca Coney Boucher, bequeathed the estate to her nephew, John Jeane Coney. Coney (d. 1862) came from a Batcombe, Somerset family. His grandfather, Bicknell Coney (1732–1812), was a director of the Bank of England.

Braywick House remained in the Coney family until the early part of the 20th century. While still owned by the Coneys, the house was sometimes rented. For example, in the first years of the 20th century, the home was the residence of Liberal Party politician Henry Bernhard Samuelson, later the 2nd of the Samuelson baronets.

In 1907 the property was sold to Sir James Richardson Andrew Clark, 2nd Baronet Clark, (1852–1948), son of prominent doctor Sir Andrew Clark, 1st Baronet (1826–1893). It then passed to his son, Sir Andrew Clark, 3rd Baronet (1898–1979).

The house was converted to office and storage space in 1959. Some companies that have since had offices there include Shooting Times, Crescent Life Assurance, Pandair Freight, Schneider Electric, and NEC.

In 1983 textile design firm Laura Ashley moved their UK retail headquarters there. Additional building updates were undertaken then and in the mid-1990s.

The house, now part of a busy commercial corridor, remains office space.

== Architecture ==
A red brick house, originally a Stuart-period design, was remodelled and expanded in the mid-to-late 18th century to a more Georgian style. The front is plain with two wings that project slightly. Inside, the main staircase is the original from the 17th century. There is good mid-18th-century Rococo plasterwork that Pevsner compares to houses by Sir Robert Taylor. The 19th-century coach house is now part of the office conversion.

== See also ==
- Grade II* listed buildings in Berkshire
