= Litten Chapel =

16th-century chapel in Newbury, Berkshire, England

Coordinates: 51.39654°N 1.32667°W

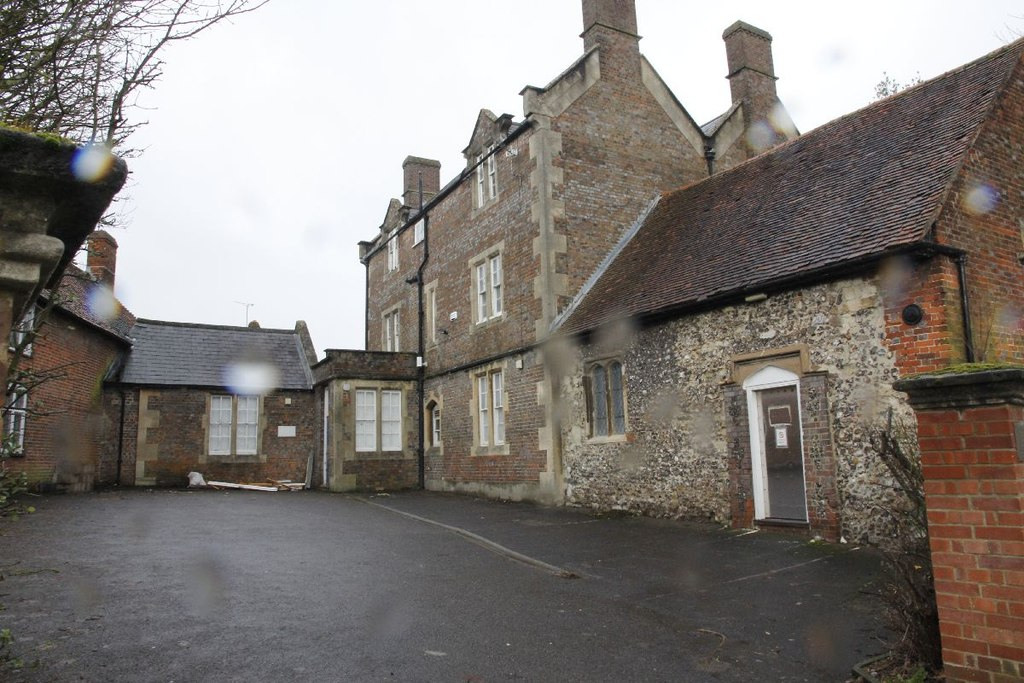
- Litten Chapel on the far right

- Location within Berkshire

General information
- Location: Newbury, Berkshire, England
- Year built: Early 16th century

Listed Building – Grade II*
- Official name: Litten Chapel
- Designated: 29 September 1950
- Reference no.: 1210610

Scheduled monument
- Official name: Litten Chapel
- Reference no.: 1005379

Litten Chapel is an early 16th-century chapel associated with the old medieval hospital of St Bartholomew in Newbury, Berkshire, England. The single storey chapel contains a set of carved timber roof trusses that are a notable example of post-medieval craftsmanship. The structure is a Grade II* listed building and a scheduled monument under the care of English Heritage.

== Description ==
The early 16th-century chapel of the old hospital of St Bartholomew is located in Newbury, England. Adjacent to the chapel is Litten House, also a Grade II* listed building. The chapel is a single storey tile roofed building, rectangular in layout. The building was constructed in flint rubble; the east gable end is built in brick. There were originally two windows on each side wall. One window was remodeled in 1947 and was converted to a doorway. The chapel contains well-preserved carved timber roof trusses (the tie-beams have been removed), which were uncovered in 1980. They are an important example of early post-medieval craftsmanship.

The structure was remodeled in the 19th and 20th centuries and the building was later turned into a school. The building was shortened at its east end around 1825 when Newton Road, Newbury was widened. There are current plans to convert the chapel into a residential property.

== History ==
The chapel was part of the old St Bartholomew hospital in Newbury. A hospital at the site existed in records in the early 13th century. "The commissioners of Henry VIII, in 1546, reported that the origin of the hospital was unknown, but that it was founded to maintain a priest to sing in the hospital, and two poor men to pray there continually." The buildings later included a chapel and accommodations for the aged and infirm. The present chapel was added to the site in the early 16th century.

The chapel was designated a Grade II* listed building in 1950, and was also designated an ancient scheduled monument in 1979. It is under the care of English Heritage.

== See also ==
- Scheduled monuments in Berkshire
- Grade II* listed buildings in Berkshire
