= Brockhurst and Marlston House School =

Independent and boarding preparatory school in Berkshire, England

Brockhurst & Marlston House Schools
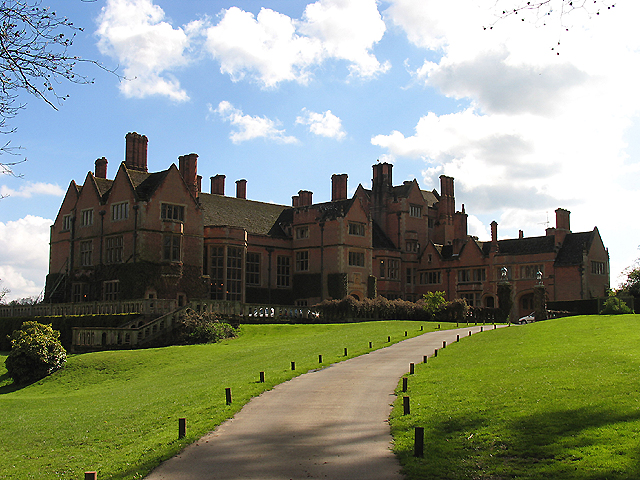
- The building in 2005

Location
- Marlston Road, Marlston; Berkshire, RG18 9UL; England; 51.443483°N 1.239065°W

Information
- Type: Independent preparatory boarding school
- Local authority: West Berkshire
- Gender: Co-educational
- Age: 2 to 13
- Enrolment: 311
- Website: www.brockmarl.org.uk

Listed Building – Grade II*
- Official name: Marlston House and surrounding terrace
- Designated: 29 November 1983
- Reference no.: 1212898

Brockhurst & Marlston House School is a British independent and boarding preparatory school. It occupies Marlston House, a Grade II* listed Elizabethan style house situated in the hamlet of Marlston and the civil parish of Bucklebury in the English county of Berkshire.

== The house ==
The house lies on a historic site, and the seat of a manor, being occupied by a house from the Elizabethan era. At one point the manor was held by Richard Wightwick, who co-founded Pembroke College of the University of Oxford. By 1855 the house was occupied by Henry Mill Bunbury, who had the house remodelled by Mr. W. Butterfield.

The current Marlston House was built between 1895 and 1899 by Edward Burgess in the Elizabethan style to replace that remodelled house. It was built for George Palmer, who was one of the founders of the Huntley & Palmers biscuit factory, mayor of the nearby town of Reading, and Member of Parliament for Reading. After George Palmer died in 1897, the house was occupied by his son, George William Palmer, who was also mayor of, and Member of Parliament for, Reading.

The house has been used as a school since 1945. It was designated a Grade II* listed building in 1983.

== The school ==
The school comprises twin parts, known as Brockhurst (boys) and Marlston House (girls), which follow a "Diamond Model" of education combining single-sex teaching from Years 3 to 7 with co-educational provision at other stages. The various facilities provided by the school include 21 acres (8.5 ha) of games fields, a sports hall, a swimming pool, tennis courts, arts and design studios, ICT suite, and equestrian school.

Brockhurst was founded in 1884 as a boys' boarding prep school at Church Stretton in Shropshire. In 1942 it moved to Broughton Hall near Eccleshall in Staffordshire. In 1945 it moved again, to its current home, becoming co-educational in 1995.

In 2009 Country Life magazine included Brockhurst and Marlston House School among the best countryside preparatory schools of Great Britain. In 2018 the school was rated 'Excellent' in all categories by the Independent Schools Inspectorate.

The school's pupils, while the school was at Church Stretton, included politicians Rab Butler and Julian Critchley. Another former pupil, Arthur Leyland Harrison, played rugby union for England in the 1914 Five Nations Championship and was posthumously awarded the Victoria Cross for his actions on the Zeebrugge Raid of 1918. The politician Michael Heseltine was a pupil at the school when it was at Broughton Hall, Staffordshire.

== Notable former pupils ==
- Frederick Corfield (1915–2005), politician
- Julian Critchley (1930–2000), journalist, author and politician
- Arthur Leyland Harrison (1886–1918), Royal Navy officer, and World War I recipient of the Victoria Cross
- Michael Heseltine (b. 1933), politician

== See also ==
- Grade II* listed buildings in Berkshire
