= Scheduled monuments in Berkshire =

List of protected ancient monuments in Berkshire, England

There are 121 scheduled monuments in Berkshire, England. These protected sites date from the Neolithic period in some cases and include barrows, moated sites, Iron Age hillforts, historic locks and ruined churches. In the United Kingdom, the scheduling of monuments was first initiated to ensure the preservation of "nationally important" archaeological sites or historic buildings. Protection is given to scheduled monuments under the Ancient Monuments and Archaeological Areas Act 1979.

== Notable scheduled monuments in Berkshire ==
Image	Name	Location	Date	Notes
	Aldermaston Lock	Padworth	1718–1723	An early 18th century lock on the Kennet and Avon Canal, at Aldermaston Wharf.
	Bussock Camp	South of Chieveley	Iron Age	A well-preserved Iron Age hillfort with a double line of defensive earthenworks.
	Donnington Castle	Donnington	late 14th century	The remains of a quadrangular castle and 17th century Civil War earthworks.
	Grimsbury Castle	Between the villages of Cold Ash and Berkshire	Iron Age	A rare, small Iron Age univallate hillfort that has not been previously excavated.
	Litten Chapel, Newbury	Newbury	Early 16th century	The small chapel of the old hospital of St. Bartholomew is a well-preserved example of early post-medieval craftsmanship.
	Monkey Marsh Lock	Thatcham	1718–1723	A historic lock on the Kennet & Avon Canal. One of two surviving examples of turf sided locks on the canal.
	Seven Barrows	Lambourn	Bronze Age	Bronze Age bowl barrow cemetery. There are more than 30 burial mounds on the site.
	Sheffield Lock	Burghfield	1718–1723	A historic lock on the Kennet & Avon Canal. It is thought to be one of only locks in the UK with scalloped chamber brick walls.

== See also ==
- Grade I listed buildings in Berkshire
- List of scheduled monuments in the United Kingdom
