= Braywick Park =

Nature reserve in Berkshire, England

Coordinates: 51.512°N 0.710°W

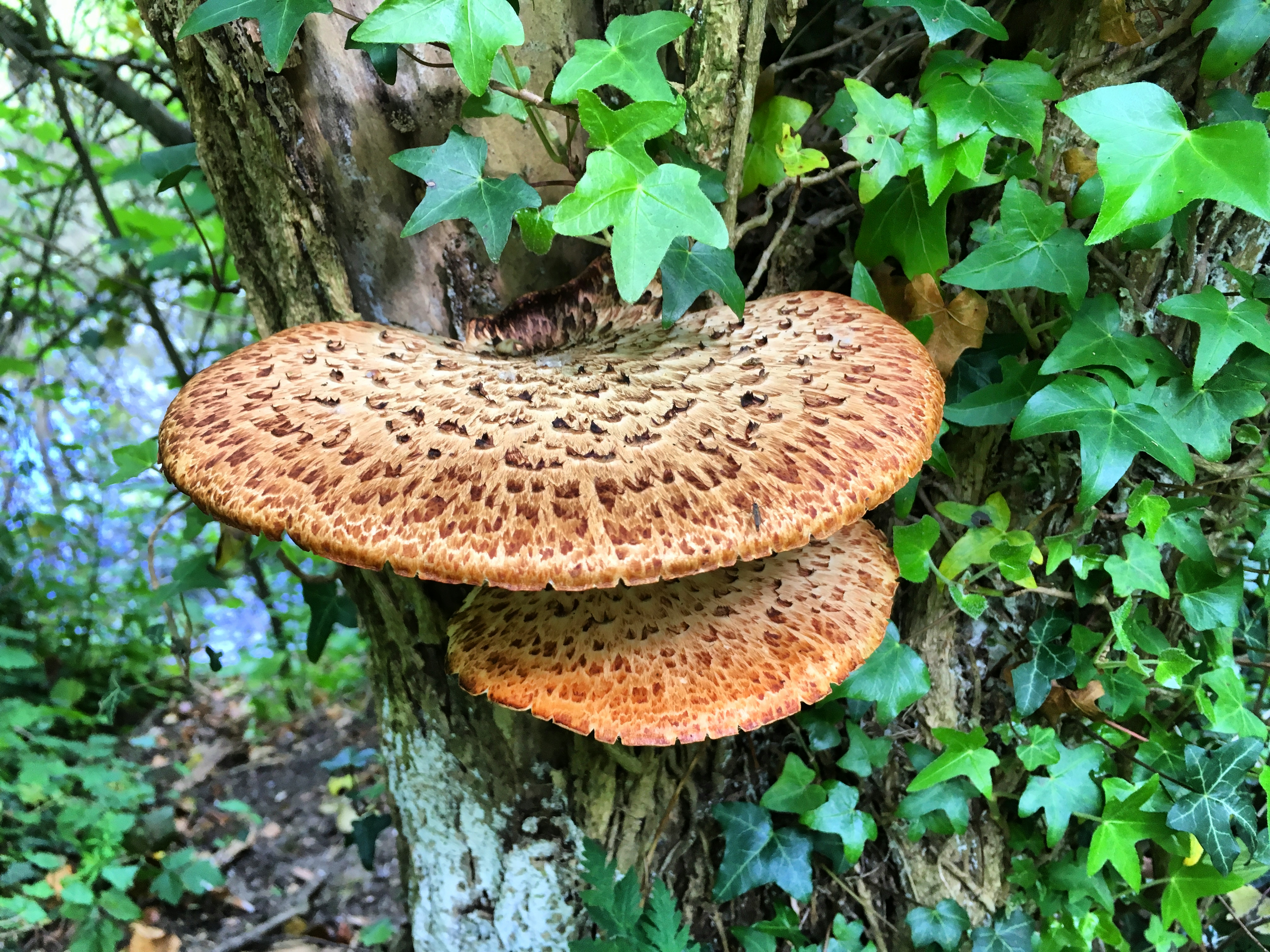
- Tree fungus in Braywick Park
- Interactive map of Braywick Park
- Type: Local Nature Reserve
- Location: Berkshire
- OS grid: SU 896 800
- Area: 12.7 hectares (31 acres)
- Manager: Royal Borough of Windsor and Maidenhead

Braywick Park is a 12.7-hectare (31-acre) Local Nature Reserve in the Braywick suburb of Maidenhead in Berkshire. It is owned and managed by Royal Borough of Windsor and Maidenhead.

== Geography and site ==
The park features formal parkland with trees and wildlife habitats including grassland, woodland and a pond.

== History ==
The park was originally part of the estate belonging to Braywick Lodge. In 1969 the 19th-century mansion was demolished, but the stables were saved and refurbished in 1989 to provide a nature centre.

In 1999 the site was declared as a local nature reserve by the Royal Borough of Windsor and Maidenhead.

== Fauna ==
The site has the following fauna:

=== Mammals ===
- European rabbit

=== Birds ===
- Red kite
