= Donnington Hospital =

Almshouses in Berkshire, England

- Donnington Hospital Trust
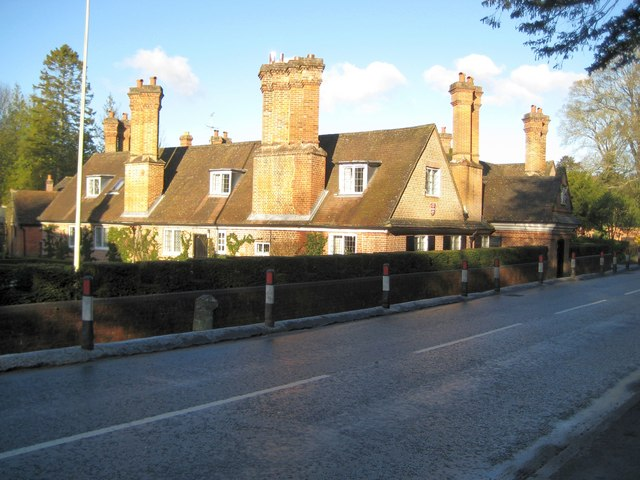
- Donnington Hospital

Geography
- Location: Donnington, Berkshire, England

Services
- Emergency department: No

History
- Founded: 1393

Links

Listed Building – Grade II*
- Official name: Donnington Hospital
- Designated: 6 June 1952
- Reference no.: 1290987

Donnington Hospital is a series of almshouses in Donnington, Berkshire, England, run by the Donnington Hospital Trust.

It was established in 1393 by Sir Richard Abberbury the Elder. The original site on the Oxford Road is now occupied by almshouses built in 1602. A further complex was added at Abberbury Close in 1938, followed by Groombridge Place in 1993. The trust also has almshouses in Bucklebury and Bray in Berkshire and Iffley in Oxfordshire.

In 1952 it was designated a Grade II* listed building.

== See also ==
- Grade II* listed buildings in Berkshire
