= Wokingham Town Hall =

Municipal building in Berkshire, England

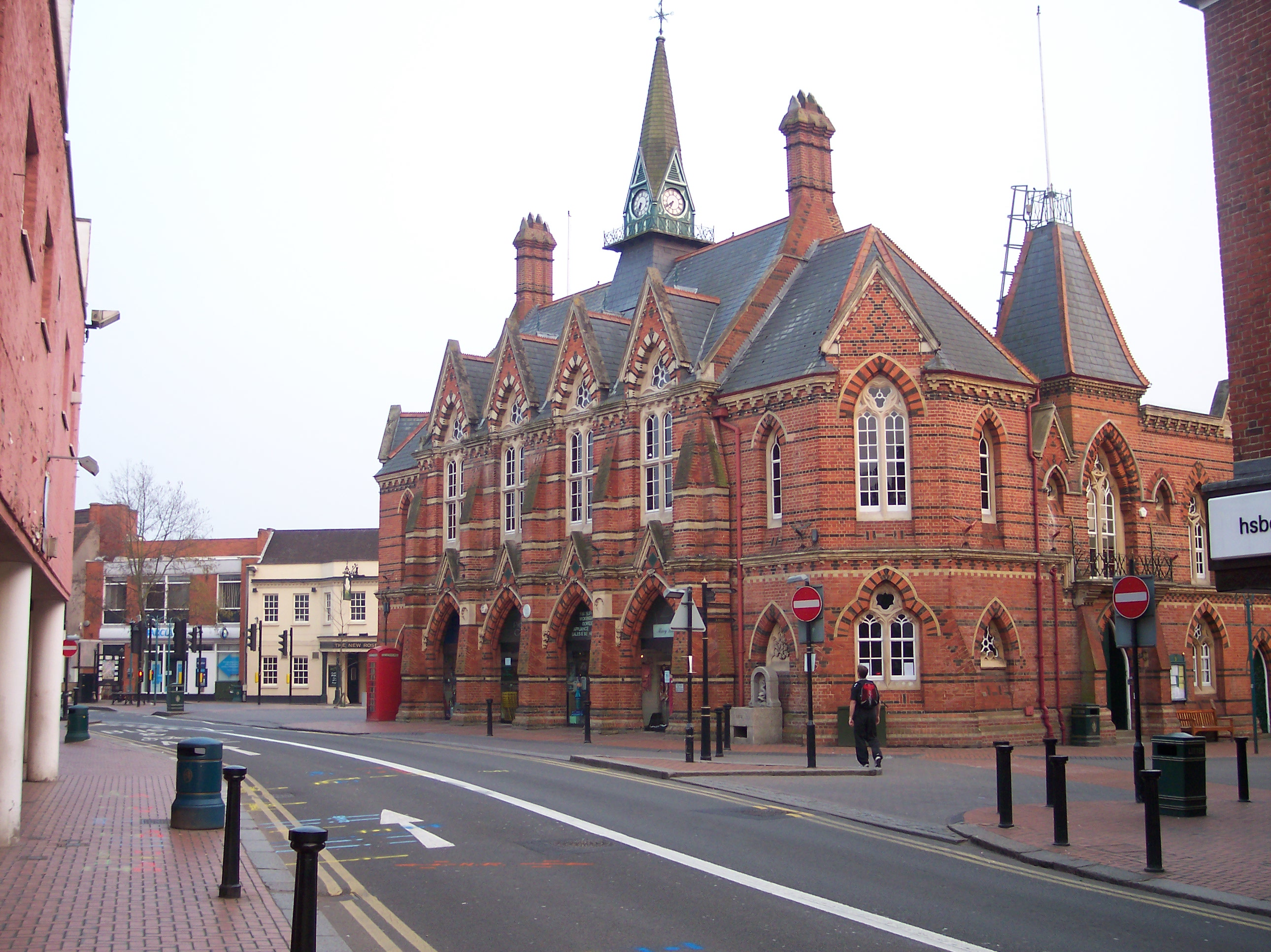
- Wokingham Town Hall

- Location within Berkshire

General information
- Architectural style: Gothic
- Location: The Market Place, Wokingham, Berkshire, England
- Coordinates: 51°24′37″N 0°50′02″W
- Year built: 1860

Design and construction
- Architects: William Ford Poulton and William Henry Woodman

Listed Building – Grade II*
- Official name: The Town Hall
- Designated: 2 October 1969
- Reference no.: 1303481

Wokingham Town Hall is a municipal building in Wokingham, Berkshire, England. The building is the meeting place of Wokingham Town Council and is a Grade II* listed building.

== History ==
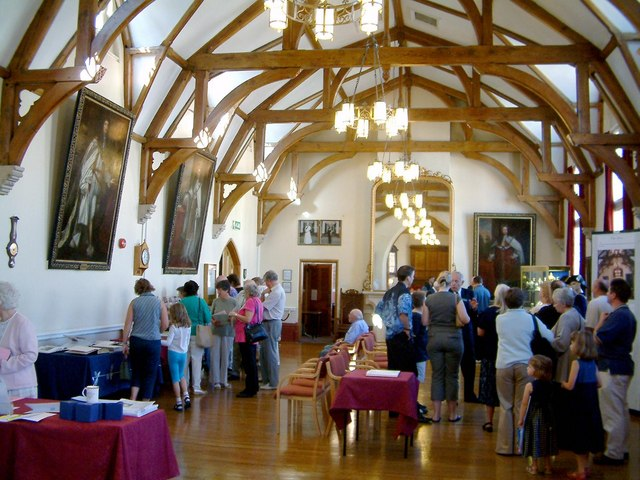
The main assembly hall

The original building on the site was a medieval guildhall completed in 1612. After significant industrial growth in the middle of the 19th century, as the silk industry and then the brick-making industry developed, civic leaders decided to replace the very dilapidated guildhall with a new structure.

The new building, which was designed by William Ford Poulton and William Henry Woodman in the Gothic style and built with red bricks from local sources, was officially opened by Lord Braybrooke on 6 June 1860. The design involved a symmetrical main frontage with six bays facing onto the Market Square; the central section of four bays, which slightly projected forward, featured pointed arched openings allowing access to the markets on the ground floor, flanked by full-height buttresses, and cross-windows on the first floor with trefoils and steep gables above. There was a 26-metre (85 ft) central clock tower with a four-sided clock with quarter-chimes, designed and manufactured by Tuckers of Theobalds Road in London and a flèche above. Internally, the principal rooms were an assembly hall with a hammerbeam roof, on the north side of the building on the first floor, and a council chamber, on the west side of the building on the first floor.

The borough council, which met in the town hall, was reformed under the Municipal Corporations Act 1883. The building contained the local police station until it relocated to Rectory Road in 1905, at which time the former police superintendent's office on the ground floor was converted into a mayor's parlour. Queen Elizabeth II, accompanied by the Duke of Edinburgh, visited the town hall and met civic officials on 26 June 1962.

The building continued to serve as the headquarters of Wokingham Municipal Borough Council for much of the 20th century until the council moved to new council offices on Wellington Road in 1965.

Following the local government reorganisation implemented under the Local Government Act 1972, the council offices on Wellington Road became the new home of the enlarged Wokingham District Council in 1974 and the town hall became the home of the new parish council, which was designated Wokingham Town Council. The building also contained the local fire station until it moved to Denton Road in July 1990.

Important works of art in the town hall include portraits by Godfrey Kneller of King George I and of John Churchill, 1st Duke of Marlborough, a portrait by Michael Dahl of Sarah Churchill, Duchess of Marlborough and a portrait by Anthony van Dyck depicting a lady and a child.

== In popular culture ==
The area outside the town hall was a venue in the 1970 film, See No Evil starring Mia Farrow.

== See also ==
- Grade II* listed buildings in Berkshire
