= Binfield Lodge =

Listed country house in Berkshire, England

- Location within Berkshire Location within England
- 51°27′03″N 0°47′15″W
- Type: Country House
- Location: Binfield, Berkshire, England
- OS grid reference: SU 84352 73136

History
- Built: 17th century

Site notes
- Architectural style: Jacobean
- Restored: 1895–97 (added)
- Restored by: Edwin Lutyens

Listed Building – Grade II*
- Official name: Binfield Lodge
- Designated: 7 December 1966; 59 years ago
- Reference no.: 1390315

Listed Building – Grade II
- Official name: Garden wall on north-west of Binfield Lodge
- Designated: 14 February 2002; 24 years ago
- Reference no.: 1390316

Listed Building – Grade II
- Official name: Small pavilion at Binfield Lodge approx 28m to north east of house
- Designated: 20 December 1972; 53 years ago
- Reference no.: 1390317

Listed Building – Grade II
- Official name: The lodge to north-west of Binfield Lodge and attached outbuilding
- Designated: 20 December 1972; 53 years ago
- Reference no.: 1390318

Binfield Lodge is an English country house. It is a historic Grade II* listed building. The house is located north of Binfield, Berkshire.

== History ==
Built by James I as one of the hunting lodges of Windsor Great Park, it later belonged to the Neville family and the Vernon family.

In the late 19th century, the house was owned by Captain Ernest Rhodes, older brother of Cecil Rhodes.

== Architecture ==
A largely Jacobean brick design from the 17th century, it was reworked in the late 18th century. The front has simple Dutch gables incorporating Diocletian windows in an almost identical arrangement to those at Prior's Court, Chieveley. Around 1897, Captain Rhodes added a ballroom and billiard room to the east end of the house. This large Neo-Georgian addition was an early project by Edwin Lutyens.

== See also ==
- Grade II* listed buildings in Berkshire
