= George Webbe =

George Webbe may refer to:

- George Webbe (MP) (by 1509 to 1556)
- George Webbe (cricketer, born 1856) (1856–1934), New Zealand cricketer
- George Webbe (cricketer, born 1854) (1854–1925), English cricketer and British Army officer

== See also ==
- George Webb (disambiguation)
