= Bradfield Hall, Berkshire =

Listed country house in Berkshire, England

Bradfield Hall
- Location within Berkshire

General information
- Type: Country House
- Architectural style: Georgian
- Location: Bradfield, Berkshire, England
- Coordinates: 51°26′25″N 1°09′16″W
- Year built: 18th century

Listed Building – Grade II*
- Official name: Bradfield Hall, adjoining kitchen block and adjoining garden wall
- Designated: 24 October 1951; 74 years ago
- Reference no.: 1289492

Listed Building – Grade II
- Official name: Stable block approximately 25 metres to north west of Bradfield Hall
- Designated: 13 April 1967; 59 years ago
- Reference no.: 1212536

Bradfield Hall is an English country house. It is a historic Grade II* listed building. The house is located southwest of Bradfield, Berkshire in the hamlet of Rotten Row.

== History ==
Bradfield Hall was built in the mid to late 18th century. Some sources give a date of 1764.

The house was most likely built for Stephen Wilson.

There is a row of four almshouses, located southeast of the house, that have a plaque on them stating "'BRADFIELD POOR HOUSE ERECTED AT THE EXPENSE OF STEPHEN WILSON ESQ 1810 AND GIVEN BY HIM TO THE PARISH FOR EVER 1811".

When Wilson died in 1814, the house, along with properties on Whitehall in London and elsewhere went to his goddaughter, Katherine Stewart Connop, who was married to the Rev. John Connop.

The house remained in the Connop family until 1898, when the house and contents were sold. A variety of famous 18th-century carved Chippendale-style mahogany chairs, now known as the "Bradfield Hall Chairs", some now in the Metropolitan Museum of Art and some now at the Lady Lever Art Gallery, along with the so-called "Barrington Bed", now in the possession of the Victoria and Albert Museum, were auctioned at this time.

Around 1900 the property passed into the hands of Arthur Radford, who had been Justice of the Peace of Derby, and whose family home had been at Smalley Hall in Derbyshire.

The Radfords held the house for the first half of the 20th century. It remains in private hands.

== Architecture ==
A large red brick house in a Georgian style. It has a "curiously informal" entrance and was originally three storeys. The top floor incorporated Diocletian windows on either side of the centre. This level was removed in around 1950 and then reinstated around 2006. The house, together with its adjoining kitchen block and garden wall, was designated a Grade II* listed building in 1951.

The saloon, two storeys high, has an oval ceiling painting attributed to Jean-François Clermont.

The house's mid-18th-century stable block is Grade II listed. It has a pedimented design in red brick with grey headers.

== See also ==
- Grade II* listed buildings in Berkshire
