= Marlston =

Coordinates: 51.442913°N 1.235777°W

- Village
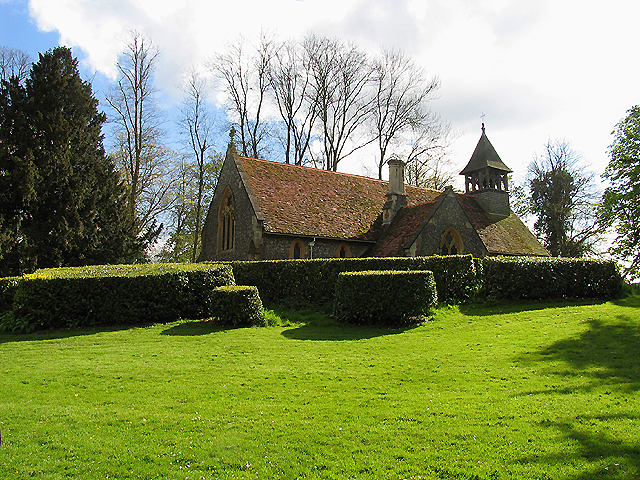
- Parish church of St Mary, Marlston

- Location within Berkshire
- OS grid reference: SU532718
- Civil parish: Bucklebury
- Unitary authority: West Berkshire
- Ceremonial county: Berkshire
- Region: South East
- Country: England
- Sovereign state: United Kingdom
- Post town: THATCHAM
- Postcode district: RG18
- Dialling code: 01635
- Police: Thames Valley
- Fire: Royal Berkshire
- Ambulance: South Central
- UK Parliament: Reading West and Mid Berkshire

Marlston is a village in the English ceremonial county of Berkshire. For administrative purposes, it lies within the civil parish of Bucklebury and the unitary authority of West Berkshire.

== Etymology ==
The place-name Marlston is first attested as Marteleston in 1242, and means "Martel's town or manor". Galfridus Martel held the manor in 1242; Martel is a French nickname meaning "hammer", from the Old French martel (modern French marteau).

== Geography ==
The settlement lies south of the M4 motorway, and is located approximately 3 miles (4.8 km) north-east of Thatcham. It is 0.5 miles (0.80 km) west of the River Pang on a minor road, midway between Hermitage and Bucklebury.

== History ==
The parish church of St Mary dates back to the 12th century, the north door is dated to circa 1170. The church was restored in 1855 by William Butterfield. It is a Grade II* listed building.

Marlston House was built between 1895 and 1899 in the Elizabethan style, replacing an Elizabethan era house on the same site. It was built for George Palmer, who was one of the founders of the Huntley & Palmers biscuit factory, mayor of the nearby town of Reading, and Member of Parliament for Reading. After George Palmer died in 1897, the house was occupied by his son, George William Palmer, who was also mayor of, and Member of Parliament for, Reading. Since 1945, it is the home of the Brockhurst and Marlston House School. The building is Grade II* listed.

The Marlston estate is owned by the Astor family.

== Notable residents ==
Douglas Bader, World War II RAF flying ace, and his wife, settled in the village after the war.
