= Warfield Church =

Historic church in Warfield, Berkshire, England

Coordinates: 51°26′31″N 0°44′07″W

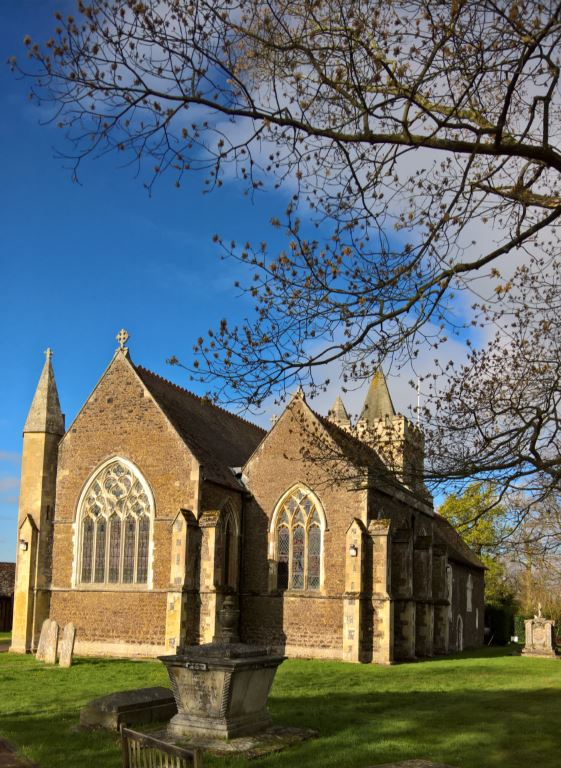
St Michael the Archangel - Warfield Parish Church

Warfield Parish Church is a Grade II* listed building. It is located on Church Lane, Warfield, in Berkshire, England, ¾ of a mile north-east of the modern centre of the village. It is dedicated to the archangel Michael (although it is sometimes referred to as St Michaels and All Saints, locally it is known as St Michael the Archangel). The area around the church has been designated a conservation area since 1974 primarily to protect the character and nature of this historical building.

Pevsner commented that "Warfield is one of the most rewarding churches around". The building charts its origins back to 1016 when Queen Emma, the wife of King Æthelred the Unready decided to give "the vill and chapel" of Warfield to the See of Winchester. Although it is likely that the location where Warfield Church now stands has been a place of worship from approximately 800AD when it was little more than a clearing in the middle of the Windsor Great Forest. "Warfelt" is mentioned in Domesday Book of 1086. In 1087 under the reign of William II, The Priory of Hurley was given patronage of Warfield, i.e., the right to appoint the Vicar. This patronage continued until 1535.

== The early years ==
The first stone church was constructed in Warfield c. 1135 under King Stephen. The church building would have been a simple timber construction before that. In 1156 Henry II signed an official charter giving the lands and church of Warfield to the Monks of Hurley.

In 1272 in the reign of Edward I a new chancel was built on the site of the present day St Katherine's chapel and glass started to be used in windows. At this date the Eucharist was only taken three times a year and all services were in Latin. In 1349 the Black Death hit Warfield. Until that point the village of Warfield was in close proximity to the church. The Black Death caused people to leave homes close to the church and relocate further afield. This explains the church's slightly isolated location today.

== The monks of Hurley ==
At the end of the 14th century the monks of Hurley moved to Warfield because the Thames flooded their priory in Hurley. The 14th century monks were formidable. They took over the Parish Church, probably using the Chancel, today's St Katherine's Chapel, as their Chapter House. They built a fine Chapel (today's Chancel) as a scaled version of that at Hurley, the chalk having been brought from the Hurley chalk pits. The monks gathered for corporate worship six times a day. Following the repair of Hurley in 1401 the monks began to return to their home besides the Thames.

Several decades after the monks returned to their Priory on the Thames, the major part of the building at Warfield was constructed out of what the monks left behind. The Tower was built in the mid 15th century and the present bell tower was completed. In the 1500s the picture of the Church would have been one of priest with his helpers in the chancel, dressed in colourful robes, speaking hardly audible tones in Latin. Across the entrance to the Chancel was a large wooden screen with statutes on it. A restored version using some of the original carving is across the entrance to St Katherine's Chapel today. The walls were highly painted with pictures and texts.

In 1523 Robert Geyn was appointed Vicar of Warfield. At the Bishop's visitation of 1550 the people complained that Geyn was not performing his duties, had employed an untrained curate (Robert Mason) to care for the church, and was using the vicarage to care for horses and pigs.

== The Protestant reformation ==
In 1570 the Warfield Parish Rooms were built. It was known as the Wake House. People used to meet annually on the feast of the dedication of the church to St Michael. The building is possibly on the site of an older monastic building.

There is always some item of background controversy however, in 1674 the Warfield Wardens state that the present vicar had given up teaching and had become a farmer. In 1677 there was a yearlong lawsuit between John Brakes (a parishioner) and the Warfield Church Wardens as to the ownership of the pew by the pulpit. The 16th and 17th centuries saw vast changes. Henry VIII's break with Rome led to the destruction of the monasteries and priories. Local churches like Warfield were also cleansed of all things that could lead to ritual and superstition. The walls were whitewashed and screens and statues would have been removed. The stone altar was also removed and replaced by a simple wooden table. There was also a large two decker pulpit.

== Memorials ==
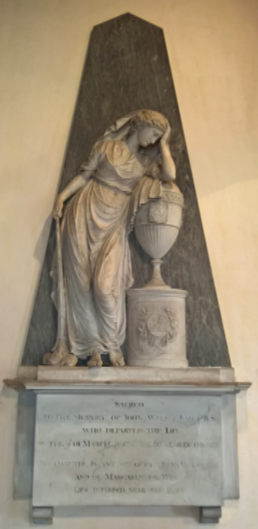

There are many memorials adorning the walls of St Michaels covering many centuries. The one shown to the left dates from the mid 18th century and is a memorial to a wife, husband and a child who died in infancy. It was only during the excavation work for the new floor in the 21st century that the nature of this memorial was realised. Almost directly beneath the memorial were found the coffins of two adults and a child. They remain unmoved - the new floor placed on top. The 1700s saw the building filled with private pews but this did not lead to high attendance. In the 1780s according to the parish records the average at Communion was less than 15 with just over double that at festivals.

== The Oxford Movement ==
By the early 19th century there was a Sunday School owing much to the model created by Robert Raikes the editor of the Gloucester Journal. In 1843 the Vicarage was burnt down, and the Vicar emigrated with the funds for the new vicarage.

In 1851 Warfield parish changed for the first time on record to create a Parish of Bracknell with its own church, Holy Trinity. In 1860 William Cocks wrote an account of Warfield church. He describes box pews, whitewashed ceiling, and a gallery across the back with a barrel organ given by Lady Jane Walsh. There was a two-deck pulpit, and the farm workers sat at the back on benches. The west gallery later to be known as the "Ormathwaite gallery" was entered by a stairway from inside the church, where his Lordship sat with his servant.

Many were concerned that the Church of England had lost its way and in the 19th century two movements arose to remedy this. One of these was the Oxford Movement with its attempt to take the Church back to its medieval sense of mystery. The Warfield Church began a journey down a more Roman Catholic form of worship.

== George Street ==
In keeping with this journey down a more Roman Catholic path, in 1874 George Street was invited by the then Vicar to redesign the building. Street's plan would involve vast work. The box pews were removed, as was the old wooden pulpit, as well as the large window above the main aisle. In went new stone work, the wooden screen across the Chapel entrance, new pews, and a new porch.

The then Vicar had used the years since 1860 to collect funds for such a venture, but Lord Ormathwaite was upset that his gallery was to be removed. A compromise was reached and the Ormathwaite pew was eventually placed at the front by the lectern. On acceptance of the plans, services moved to the Parish Rooms for the next three years. The majority of the restoration work was completed and the church reopened on Tuesday, September 26, 1876. Services on that day were 8:30 am Communion, 11:00am Morning Service, and 4:00pm Evening Service. The church was filled for all services with a very large number of visitors. The Bishop of Oxford presided over the day. The total cost for the work was £3,060 of which £2,250 had been raised locally.

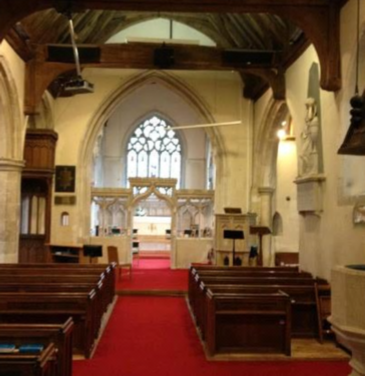
St Michaels circa 2000

The church was dedicated to St Michael and All Angels. The work involved the removal of the ceiling, box pews, west gallery, the installing of new seating, stone pulpit, and stone font. These items remain in the building, albeit in new locations after the early 21st century renovation.

== The 20th Century ==
Towards the end of the 20th Century red carpets were fitted in the church, the choir pews removed, and a balcony added - although no additional stairs were added, so access to the balcony was still via the stone bell tower steps and through the ringing chamber. Sound systems were also installed during this period as was a large screen - initially to use with an overhead projector and later with a digital projectorer.

== Into the 21st century ==
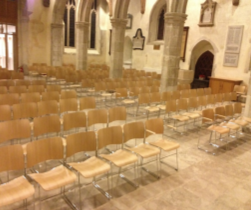
After the 2013 renovations

2013 saw a major renovation taking place at the Parish Church of St Michaels. The red carpet added at the end of the 20th century was removed, as was the existing floor, balcony and remaining pews. Underfloor heating was installed under Purbeck stone. The entrance lobby was renovated and new glass doors installed. The font was moved to stand near the south door and the pulpit relocated to the edge of St Katherine's chapel. The reordering cost just under £500,000.

The Warfield community celebrated 1,000 years of Warfield Church in 2016.
