= Boyn Hill =

Suburb of Maidenhead, Berkshire, England

Coordinates: 51.51°N 00.74°W

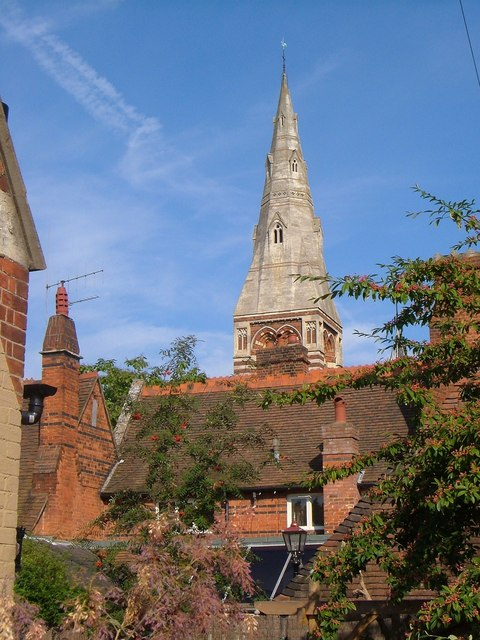
- All Saints' Church, Boyn Hill, Maidenhead (September 2005)

- Location within Berkshire
- OS grid reference: SU8780
- Shire county: Berkshire
- Region: South East
- Country: England
- Sovereign state: United Kingdom
- Police: Thames Valley
- Fire: Royal Berkshire
- Ambulance: South Central

Boyn Hill is a suburb of Maidenhead in the English county of Berkshire.

It is located west of the town centre, between the A4 and the railway.
