= Kiln Green =

Village in Berkshire, England

Coordinates: 51.49870°N 0.83019°W

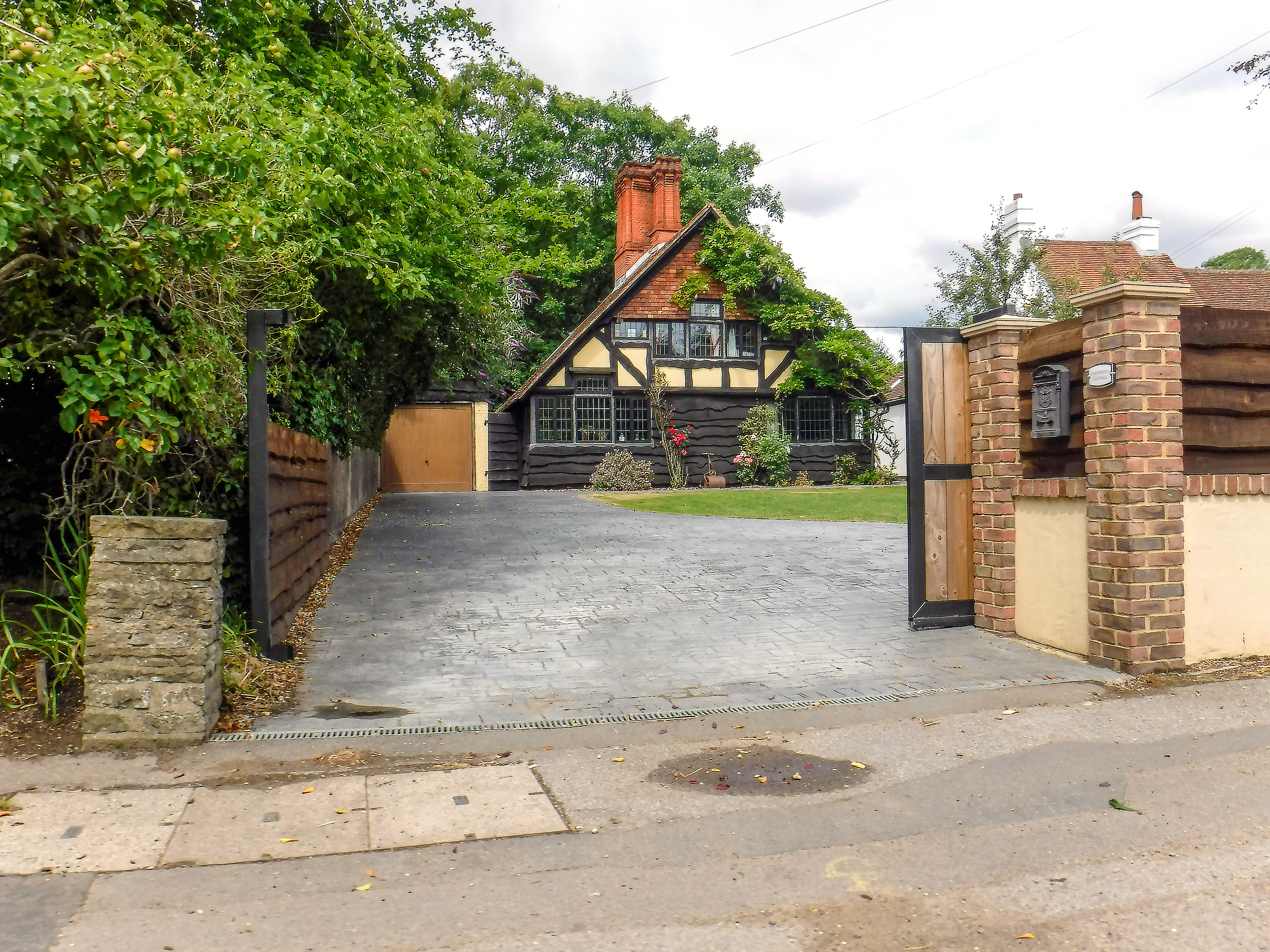
Cartwheel Cottage

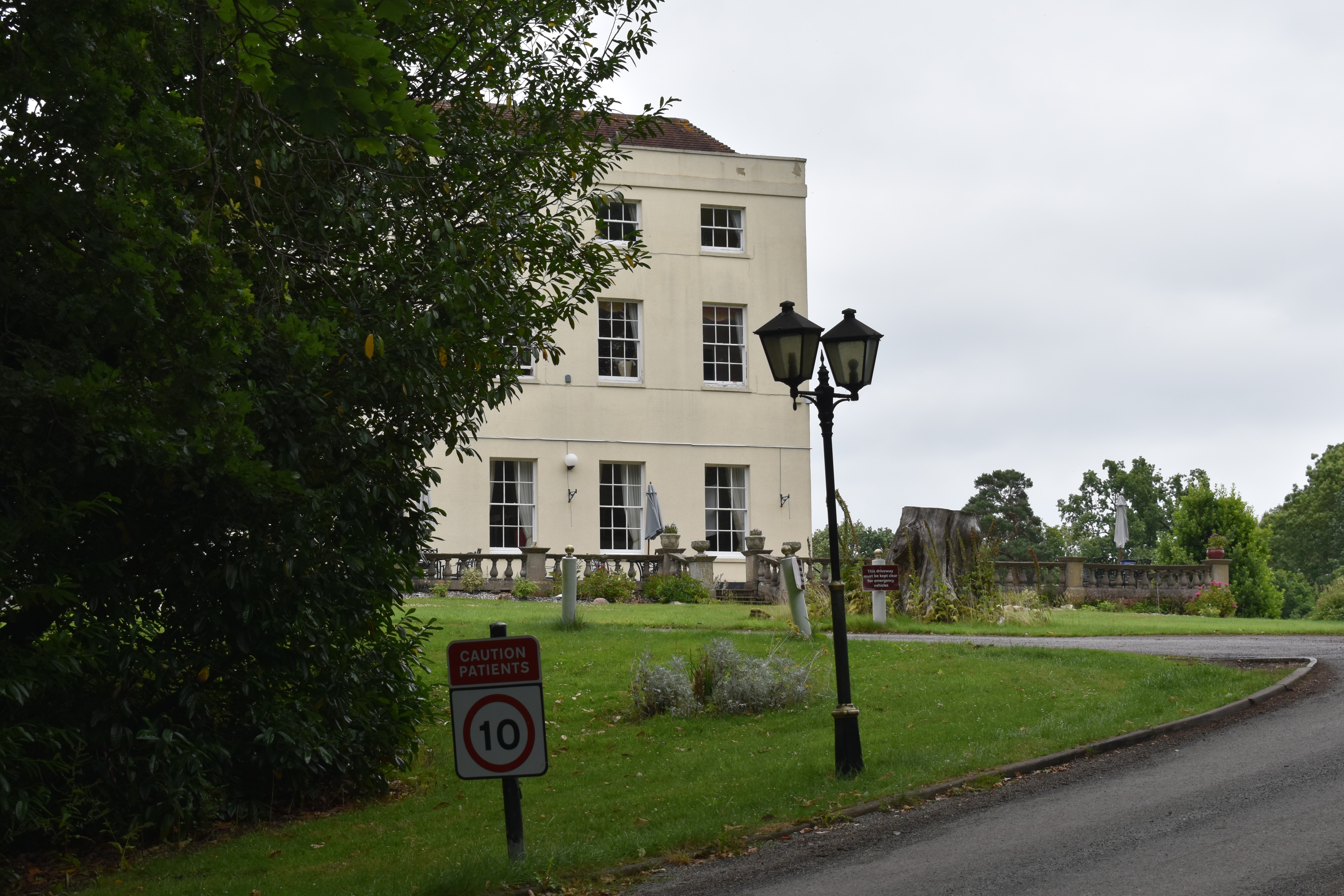
Linden Hill Clinic

Kiln Green is a small village in the civil parish of Wargrave in the English county of Berkshire. It is at grid reference SU813784 on the A4 Bath Road between Knowl Hill to the east and Hare Hatch to the west. The village includes Linden Hill to the north and Scarletts to the south. It is the location of Castle Royle Golf Country Club, which includes a gym, a swimming pool and a golf course.
