= Bray Meadows =

Meadow area in Berkshire, England

- Site of Special Scientific Interest
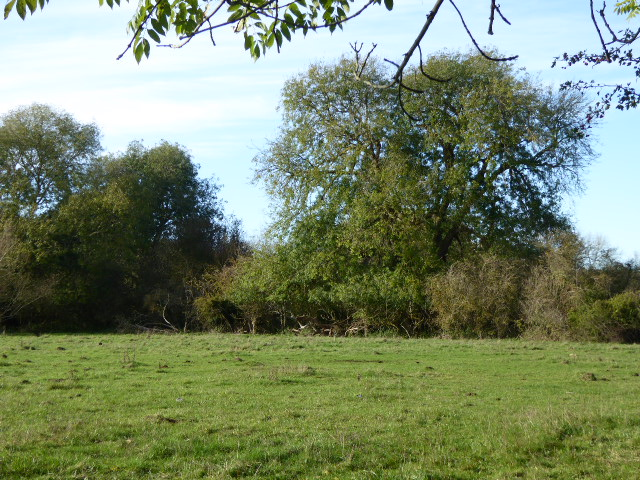

- Location within Berkshire
- Location of Bray Meadows.
- Area of search: Berkshire
- Grid reference: SU 898 800
- Coordinates: 51.512°N 0.709°W
- Interest: Biological
- Area: 6.6 hectares (16 acres)
- Notification date: 1998
- Location map: Magic Map

Bray Meadows is a 6.6-hectare (16-acre) biological Site of Special Scientific Interest in Maidenhead in Berkshire.

These unimproved meadows adjacent to a side channel of the River Thames have a rich diversity of flora. River bank plants include the nationally scarce parasitic greater dodder. There are typical damp meadow plants such as meadow barley, lesser stitchwort and meadowsweet, while one of the fields has many ant hills.

The site is private land with no public access.
