= Braywick, Berkshire =

Coordinates: 51°30′N 0°43′W

Bray Wick
- Suburb
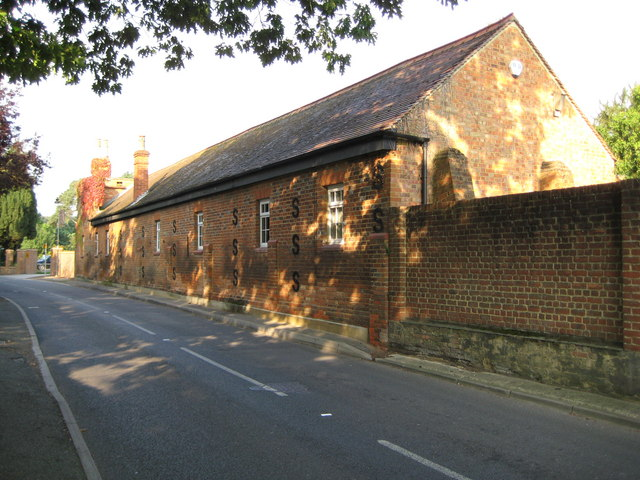
- Braywick Nature Centre

- Location within Berkshire
- OS grid reference: SU8979
- Shire county: Berkshire
- Region: South East
- Country: England
- Sovereign state: United Kingdom
- Post town: Maidenhead
- Postcode district: SL6
- Police: Thames Valley
- Fire: Royal Berkshire
- Ambulance: South Central

Braywick (sometimes written as Bray Wick) is a linear suburb south of the town of Maidenhead in Berkshire, England. It was formerly part of the parish of Bray.

== Geography ==
=== Natural conservation areas ===
Braywick Park is a park and local nature reserve on the west side of the York Stream. Adjoining this, on the east side of the stream, is a site of Special Scientific Interest (SSSI) called Bray Meadows.

== Notable people ==
- Arthur Dillon (1750–1794) was an Irish Catholic aristocrat born in England who inherited the ownership of a regiment that served France under the Ancien Régime during the American Revolutionary War and then the French First Republic during the War of the First Coalition.
