= Cranbourne, Berkshire =

Village in Berkshire, England

Coordinates: 51.445788°N 0.671737°W

Cranbourne
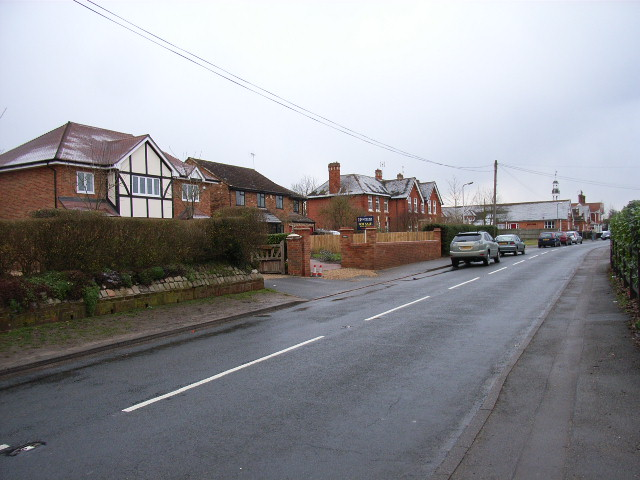
- Plaistow Green, Cranbourne. Looking eastwards along the A330 to the primary school.

- Location within Berkshire
- OS grid reference: SU926727
- Metropolitan borough: Bracknell Forest
- Metropolitan county: Berkshire
- Region: South East
- Country: England
- Sovereign state: United Kingdom
- Post town: WINDSOR
- Postcode district: SL4
- Dialling code: 01344
- Police: Thames Valley
- Fire: Royal Berkshire
- Ambulance: South Central
- UK Parliament: Maidenhead

Cranbourne is a village in Berkshire, England, within the civil parish of Winkfield in the borough of Bracknell Forest. The settlement lies near to Windsor Great Park and Legoland Windsor, and is approximately 3.5 miles (5.6 km) south-west of Windsor. Neither Cranbourne Chase nor Cranbourne Lodge, which it surrounds, are in Winkfield but across the border in Windsor.

== History ==
Cranbourne was the location of a free school that eventually became Ranelagh Church of England School. St Peter's Church was built in 1850. The Fleur de Lis pub on the corner of Hatchet Lane is now flats.

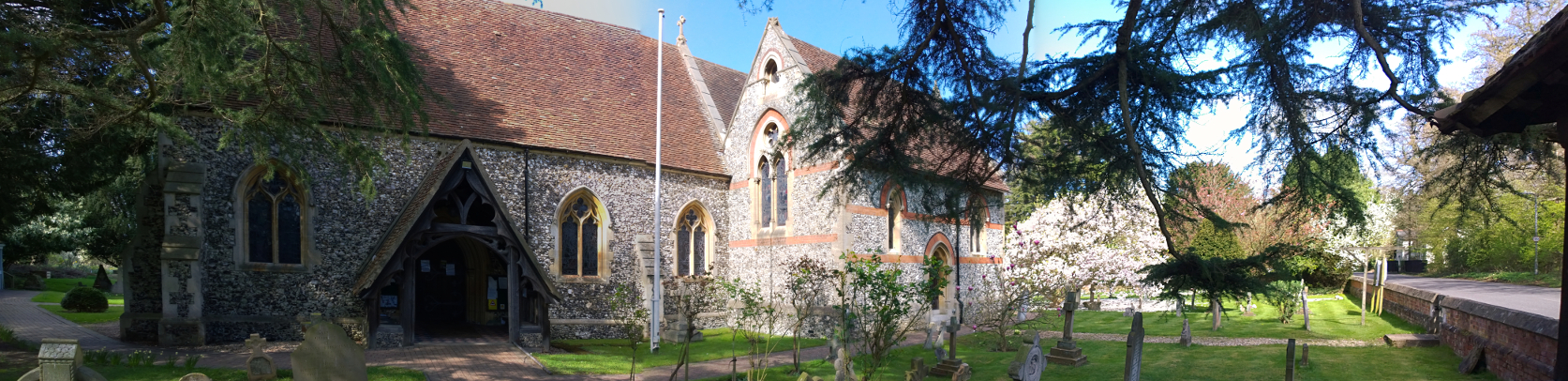
St Peter's Church, Cranbourne
