= George Webb Restaurants =

Restaurant chain in Wisconsin, U.S.

George Webb Corporation
- Type: Restaurant Franchise
- Industry: Restaurants
- Founded: May 1948; 78 years ago
- Number of locations: 31
- Area served: United States (Wisconsin only)
- Products: Breakfast foods, hamburgers and sandwiches, soups, chili, and premium blend coffee
- Services: Made-To-Order Food
- Website: www.georgewebb.com

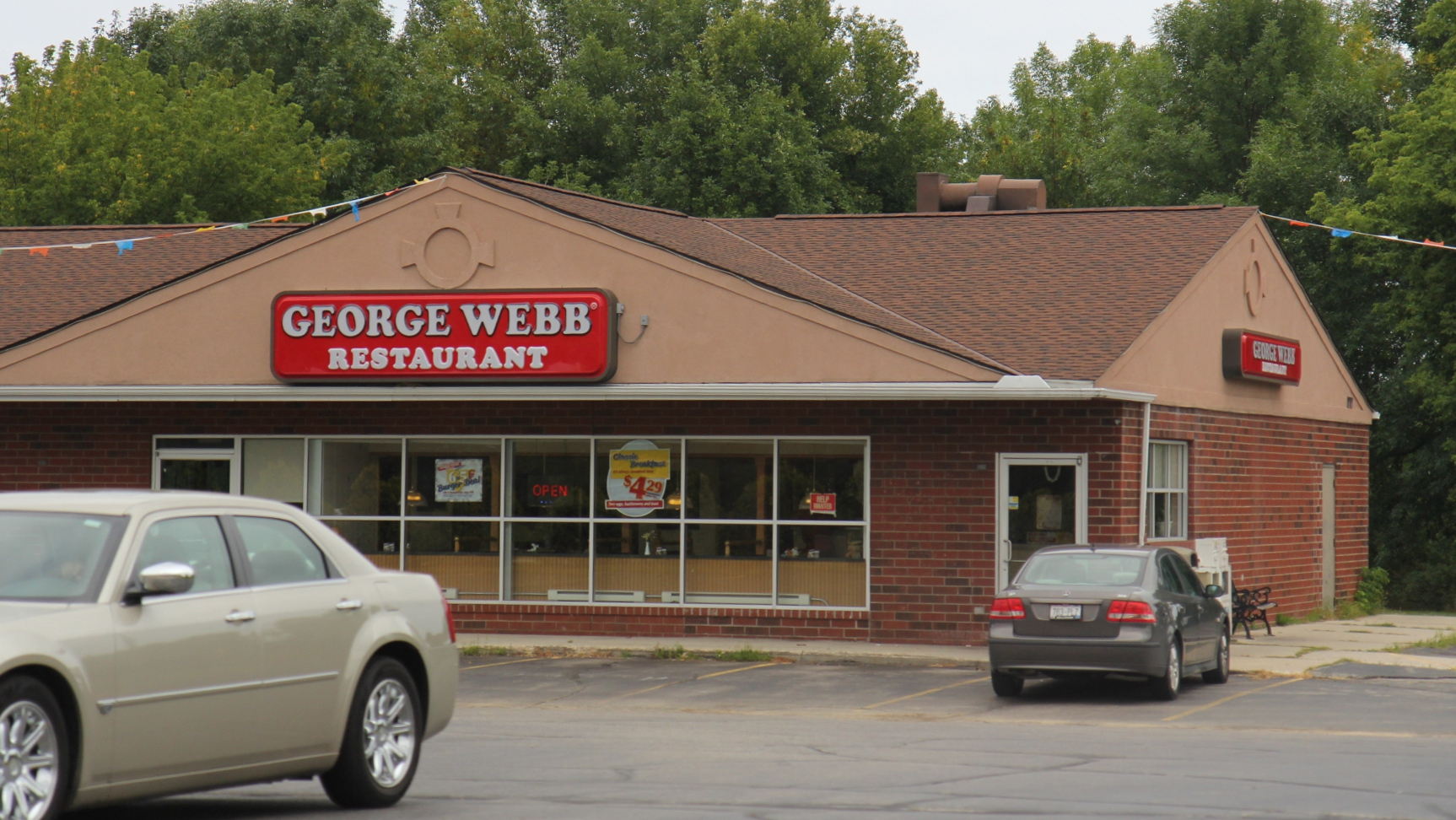
George Webb Restaurant location in Port Washington, Wisconsin

George Webb Corporation is an American chain of 31 lunch counter-style restaurants in the state of Wisconsin. After starting as a single lunch counter operation, George Webb Restaurants evolved into a chain of full-service family establishments serving made-to-order breakfasts, hamburgers and other sandwiches, soups, chili, and premium blend coffee.

== History ==
In May 1948, George Webb opened the first "George Webb and Sons" lunch counter on the corner of Ogden and Van Buren Streets on the east side of Milwaukee, Wisconsin. It began as a family business, with George, his wife Evelyn, and their three sons, Jim, Tom and Bob, all performing various tasks in the restaurant.

In 1953, Jim Webb became the first George Webb franchise owner, when it was suggested by his father that he take over one of the restaurants. In 1957, not long after the business was passed on to his son, George Webb died. Jim Webb took over the management of the company, serving as president during a period of strong growth from the 1960s through the 1980s. In 1985, Jim Webb sold the thriving chain to Dave Stamm, who had been a franchisee with the company for over 30 years.

In 2005, after leading the company for 20 years, Dave Stamm turned operations over to Whitefish Bay businessman Philip Anderson, who had previously built a national rubber seal distributorship before taking on the task of managing George Webb Restaurants. George Webb celebrated its 60th birthday in 2008, though struggling to make this milestone. The company was in danger of going bankrupt in the middle of 2008. In an effort to get George Webb Restaurants out of the financial crisis, Anderson, who had lent money for the 2005 purchase of the company, pushed out owner Jayne Aliota and took over day-to-day operations. As of 2008, Webb had 40 locations including nine owned by the company.

Later, the ownership of George Webb passed to M&I Bank, which held a loan that financed the business. In mid 2010, Philip Anderson bought Webb's assets from M&I. Webb required franchise operators to sign new agreements to get the franchises in a more typical franchise agreement with standardized menus. In August 2011, six former George Webb restaurants left the chain becoming "Griddlers Cafe". As of late 2018, only two of these Griddlers Cafes remained.

== Gimmicks ==
George Webb was a man noted for his gimmicks, and the restaurants continue that tradition. Locations have signs that display senseless phrases such as "Free rabbit lunch tomorrow", or "pay $10.00 for 1,893 pennies".

=== Clocks ===
George Webb Restaurants display two clocks side by side in every restaurant, and there are two stories describing how this came about. One says that Webb originally had a wall full of clocks so that his patrons who used a nearby streetcar service would know the time. He had different clocks set at the time for different places around the world. The streetcar rattled the clocks so violently that most of them eventually fell off the wall. If asked, a worker will say that there had been a local law stating that no business could be open 24 hours per day. Webb installed two clocks and set them one minute apart. Technically, the company was closed one minute per day on one clock but not the other and Webb announced that his restaurants were open "23 hours, 59 minutes and 59 seconds, seven days a week and on Sundays". All George Webb locations are open 24 hours a day, 7 days a week, except on holidays.

=== Baseball prediction ===
George Webb Restaurants are famous for the traditional baseball prediction game that began in the 1940s and continues today. Webb was a baseball fan, and each year he predicted that the minor league Milwaukee Brewers would win 17 straight games. He continued the prediction as a publicity stunt when the Boston Braves (later Atlanta Braves) moved to Milwaukee in 1953. He printed napkins saying "George Webb's predicts the Braves will win 12 straight games." The Braves left Milwaukee for Atlanta in 1965. The existing Milwaukee Brewers major league team began in 1970 and he continued the promotion. The prediction continued in the 1970s with three 10-game wins streaks. While George Webb never promised to give away free hamburgers if the team won 12 straight games, on April 19, 1987, the Brewers won 12 straight games after a dramatic late inning win (the streak would reach 13) and in a three-day time period, 168,194 hamburgers were given away.

In addition to their 12 win prediction, George Webb's has on occasion offered 5 burgers for just $5 when the Brewers score 5 runs or more in any game, win or lose, home or away. This offer has been valid the moment the 5th run is scored until midnight the following day. For spring training, the promotion has typically been expanded, allowing customers to get the 5 for $5 deal any time during a ten-day period, regardless of the score.

On October 12, 2018, the Brewers recorded their 12th consecutive win with a 6–5 win over the Los Angeles Dodgers in Game 1 of the 2018 National League Championship Series. Webb announced the free deal would be honored on October 18.

On August 13, 2025, the Brewers recorded their 12th consecutive win with a 12-5 defeat of the Pittsburgh Pirates. Webb announced the deal would be honored on August 20.

== Controversies ==
Because of George Webb's commitment to staying open 24 hours a day, combined with the restaurants' reasonably low prices on food and drink, the chain has become a notorious refuge for homeless adults and juveniles. George Webb Restaurants have displayed a "No Loitering" sign in every restaurant, placed a two dollar minimum per person and a 20-minute time limit for a visit, although this rule is not strictly enforced.
