= Albion Terrace, Reading =

Listed terrace in Berkshire, England

Albion Terrace
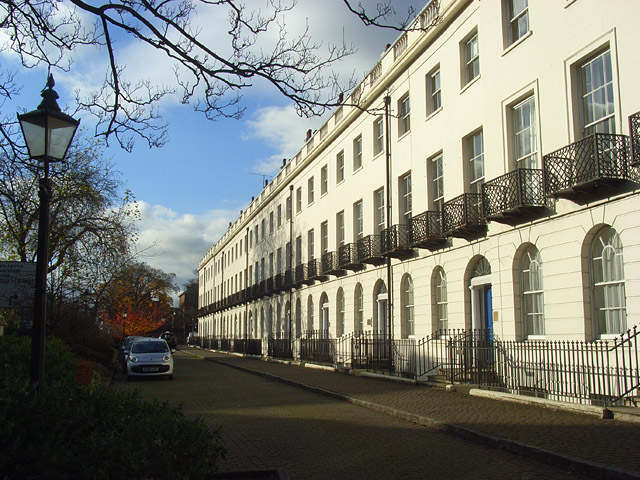
- Albion Terrace frontage

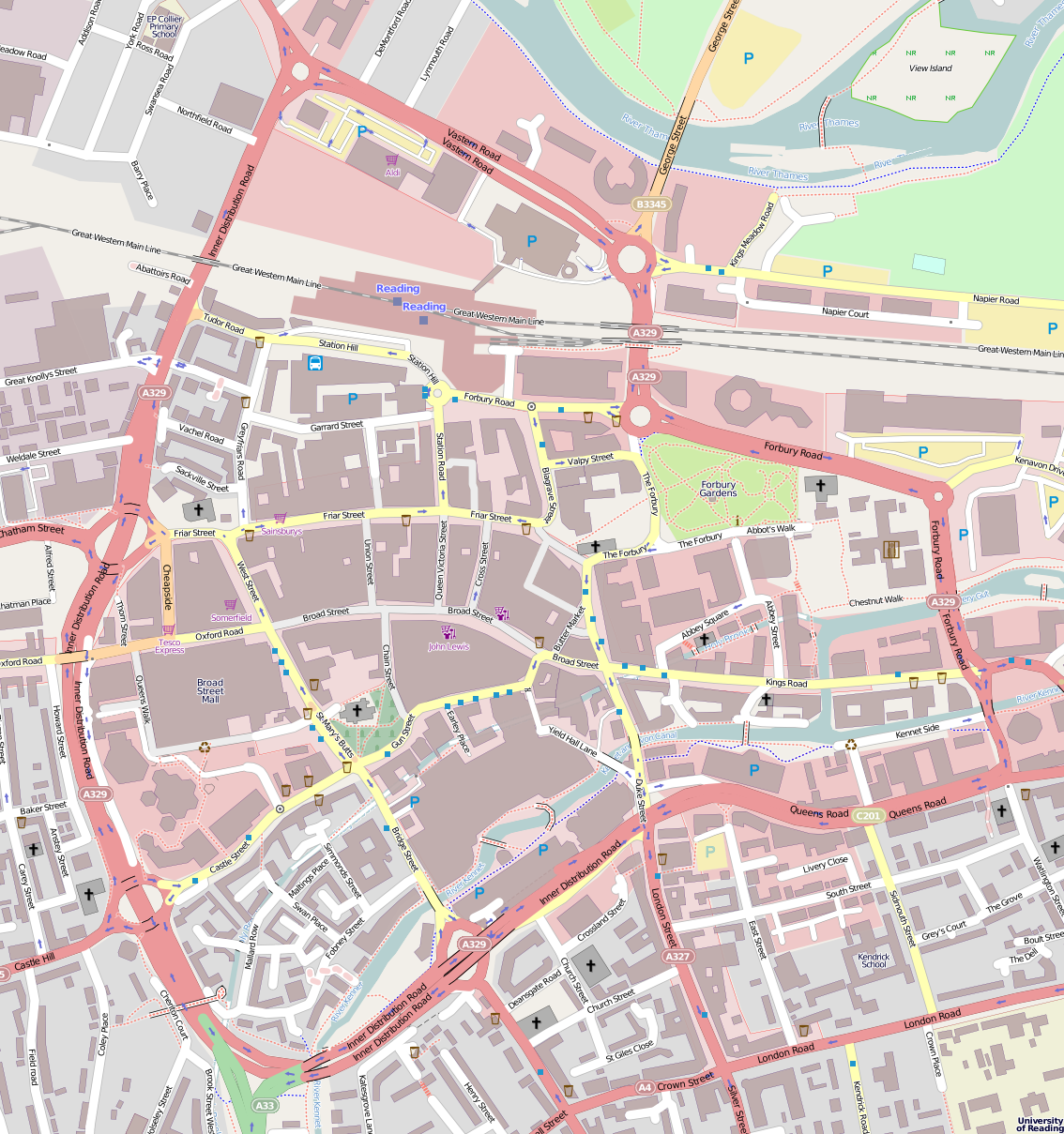
- Location within Reading Town Centre
- 51.45134°N 0.96243°W
- Location: Reading, Berkshire, England

History
- Built: 1825–35

Site notes
- Architect: Richard Billing

Listed Building – Grade II*
- Official name: Albion Place
- Designated: 22 March 1957
- Reference no.: 1113506

Albion Terrace, also known as Albion Place, is a 19th-century residential terrace in the town of Reading in the English county of Berkshire. It is a Grade II* listed building, and forms part of the Kendrick conservation area.

The terrace is situated at numbers 45 to 65 (odd numbers only) of London Road. It is opposite the frontage of the University of Reading's London Road Campus and close to both Kendrick School and the Royal Berkshire Hospital. It was built by Richard Billing, a local architect and builder, between 1825 and 1835.

The terrace is of three main floors, together with an attic and basement. The frontage is stucco, and the roof is slate. There is a string under the first floor windows, and a moulded cornice with parapet, which has balustraded panels over the windows. The terrace is symmetrical, with the two end houses projecting slightly. Each house has three semi-circular headed dormers, some with radiating glazing and three ranges of glazing bar sash windows, whilst the end houses have architrave and cornice to the centre first floor windows. The property is fronted by a carriage sweep (an area designed to enable the turning of horse-drawn carriages), with pairs of panelled pyramidal-capped stone piers at each end.

Albion Terrace was acquired and internally rebuilt as an apartment complex by Thomas Homes in the 1990s. Prior to this it had comprised 11 separate houses, many of which were, by the time of the rebuilding, in multiple occupancy.

== See also ==
- Grade II* listed buildings in Berkshire
