= George William Webb =

British architect (1853–1936)

George Webb (1853–1936) was a Scottish-born architect who had a business in Reading, Berkshire, England. He in known for designing the Ellangowan Hotel (Ellengowan in ref.) in Creetown, Kirkcudbrightshire, Scotland in 1898. The interior of this hotel was used to portray the "Green Man" public house in The Wicker Man (1973).
