= Cranbourne Lodge =

Former house in Windsor Great Park, Berkshire, England

Coordinates: 51.44924°N 0.64404°W

Cranbourne Tower
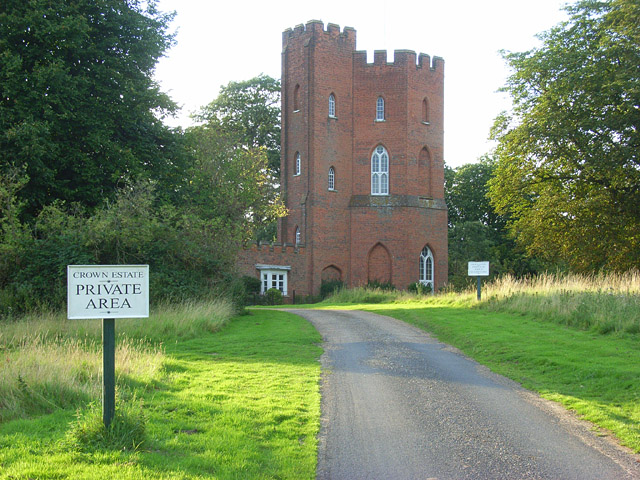
- Cranbourne Tower

- Location within Berkshire

General information
- Location: Windsor, Berkshire, England
- Renovated: Late 18th century (altered)

Listed Building – Grade II*
- Official name: Cranbourne Tower
- Designated: 2 October 1975
- Reference no.: 1319295

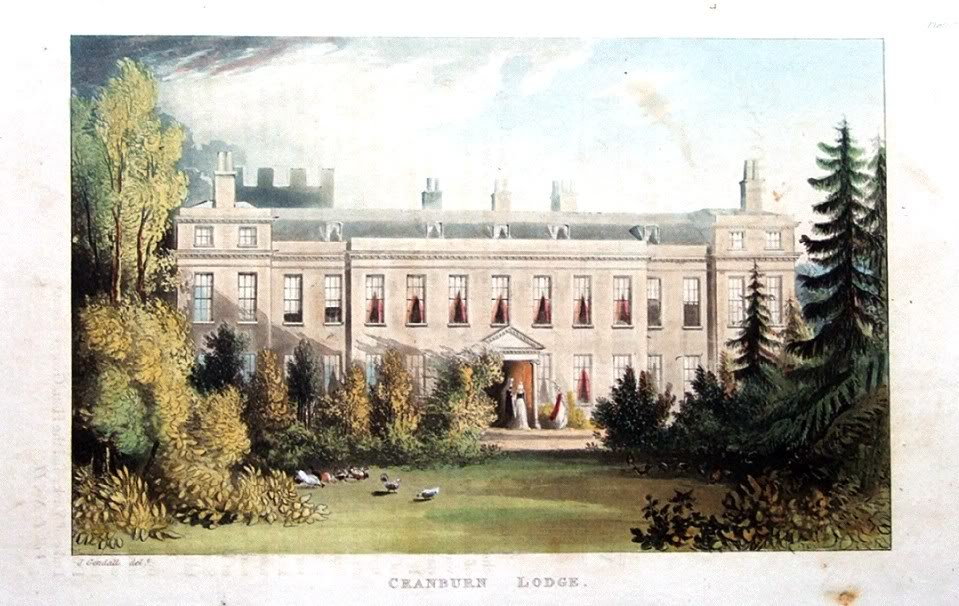
Cranbourne Lodge in 1823

Cranbourne Lodge was a keeper's lodge for the royal hunting grounds of Cranbourne Chase, once adjoining but now part of Windsor Great Park in the English county of Berkshire. All that remains of it today is the Grade II* listed Cranbourne Tower.

== History ==
The house's origins date from when the royal forest of Windsor was divided up in the 13th century. A substantial house was certainly built there in the reign of King Henry VII. During the reign of his son, Henry VIII, it was the residence of his favourite, Richard Weston. Anne Hyde was born there in 1638. The building was rebuilt and expanded several times in its history, notably by Sir George Carteret, who was visited there by Samuel Pepys. The largest house on the site, including the surviving tower, was erected in 1808.

=== Princess Charlotte ===
In 1814 the young Princess Charlotte, daughter of the Prince Regent (later George IV), was made a virtual prisoner at the Lodge. George and her mother, Caroline of Brunswick, had long been estranged and his relationship with their daughter was little better. As was not unusual at the time, his solution was to marry off this problematic daughter as soon as possible. An engagement with William II of the Netherlands was made in 1814, but this was soon broken off. Charlotte became infatuated with the minor prince Augustus of Prussia, despite his being seen as below the station of a likely future Queen of the United Kingdom. The fact he was already married would have been its own hindrance too. In July 1814, George dismissed her loyal servants, expelled her from her previous home at Warwick House, and forced her to move to Cranbourne, with a staff of his choice.

The Prince Regent had been increasingly unpopular with the people, whilst Charlotte and her Whig sympathies were seen as populist reformers. Her incarceration was also unpopular, drawing attention from the Romantic poets Byron and Shelley.

Charlotte also attracted the attention of Prince Leopold of Saxe-Coburg-Saalfeld. After gaining the Prince's permission to court her at Cranbourne, Charlotte was released from her house arrest in January 1816 and they were married at Carlton House in May. The marriage was a tragic one though, and little over a year later, Charlotte died in childbirth. As the only surviving legitimate grandchild of George III, and thus the only clear royal heir, this dynastic crisis led to "a mad dash towards matrimony by most of her bachelor uncles", a race to provide a further heir that in turn led to Queen Victoria.

== Cranbourne Tower ==
Today only the Cranbourne Tower remains, as a private residence. The main house fell into disrepair during the 19th century, particularly the main roof. It was demolished in 1865, although this tower was spared as a somewhat independent structure. It was designated a Grade II* listed building in 1975.

== See also ==
- Grade II* listed buildings in Berkshire
