= Chilton Foliat =

Village in Wiltshire, England

Coordinates: 51.432°N 1.540°W

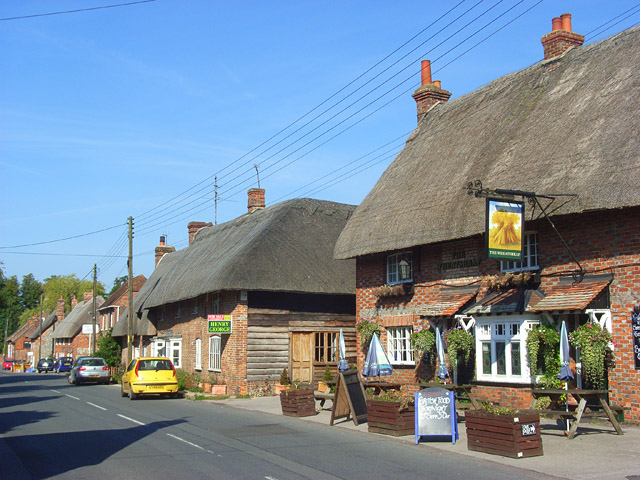

- Location within Wiltshire
- Population: 363 (in 2011)
- OS grid reference: SU321704
- Civil parish: Chilton Foliat
- Unitary authority: Wiltshire
- Ceremonial county: Wiltshire
- Region: South West
- Country: England
- Sovereign state: United Kingdom
- Post town: Hungerford
- Postcode district: RG17
- Dialling code: 01488
- Police: Wiltshire
- Fire: Dorset and Wiltshire
- Ambulance: South Western
- UK Parliament: East Wiltshire
- Website: www.chiltonfoliat.com

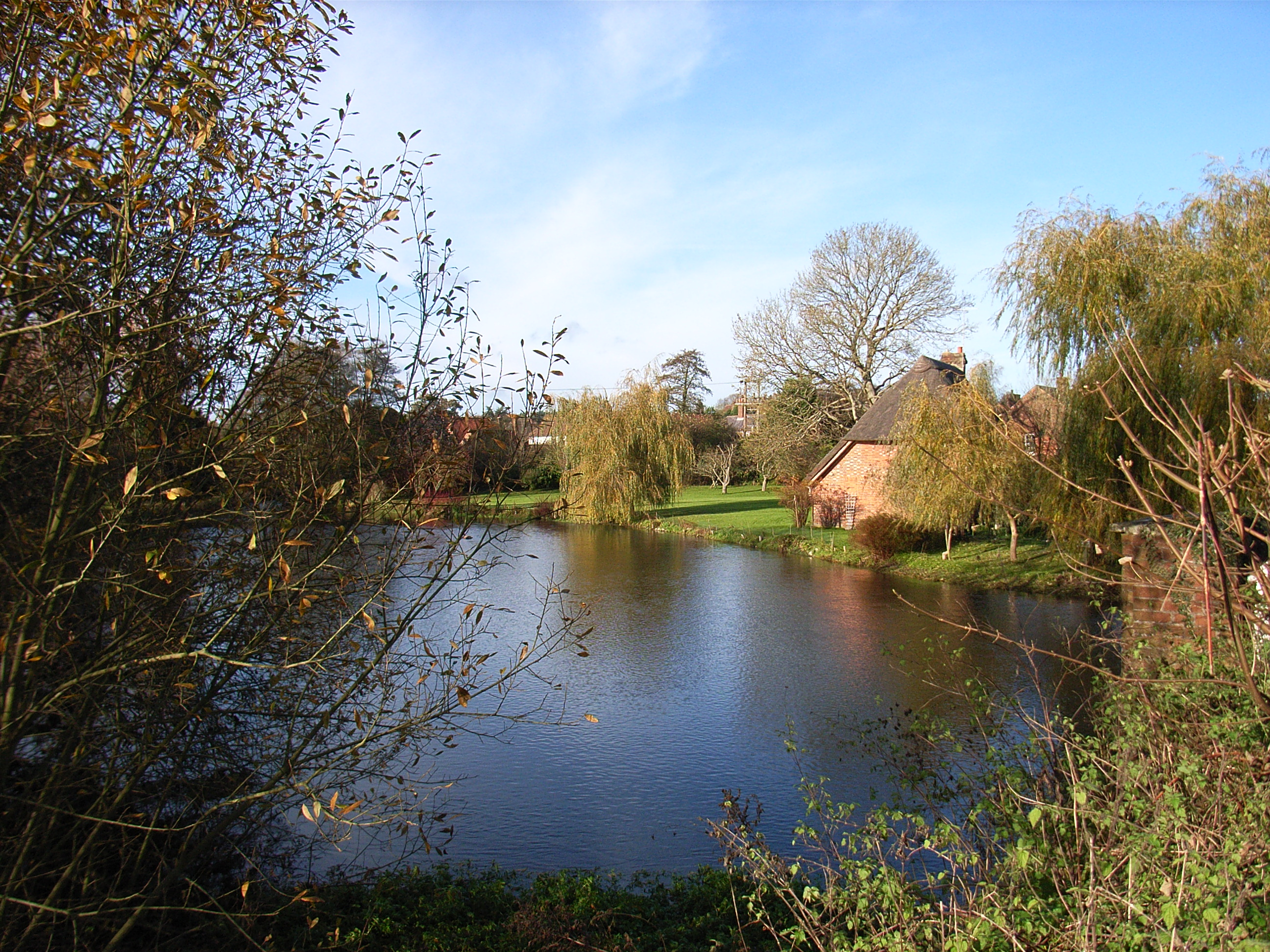
River Kennet at Chilton Foliat

Chilton Foliat is a village and civil parish on the River Kennet in Wiltshire, England. The parish is in the North Wessex Downs Area of Outstanding Natural Beauty. It is on the county boundary with West Berkshire and is about 1.5 miles (2.4 km) northwest of the Berkshire market town of Hungerford.

The village is on the B4192 Hungerford-Swindon road, which was the A419 until 1977, when it was redesignated after the opening of the M4 motorway. The parish includes the hamlets of Straight Soley and Crooked Soley.

== History ==
The ancient parish of Chilton Foliat straddled the Wiltshire/Berkshire border. In 1895 the Berkshire portion, including the village of Leverton and the Chilton Lodge estate, was transferred to Hungerford civil parish.

Chilton Aircraft, a small manufacturer in the 1930s and 1940s, had its factory within the Chilton Lodge estate.

From the estate of Lady Ward at Chilton Foliat, in 1942 U.S Army paratroopers trained with their British counterparts and deployed to combat in North Africa.

== Religious sites ==
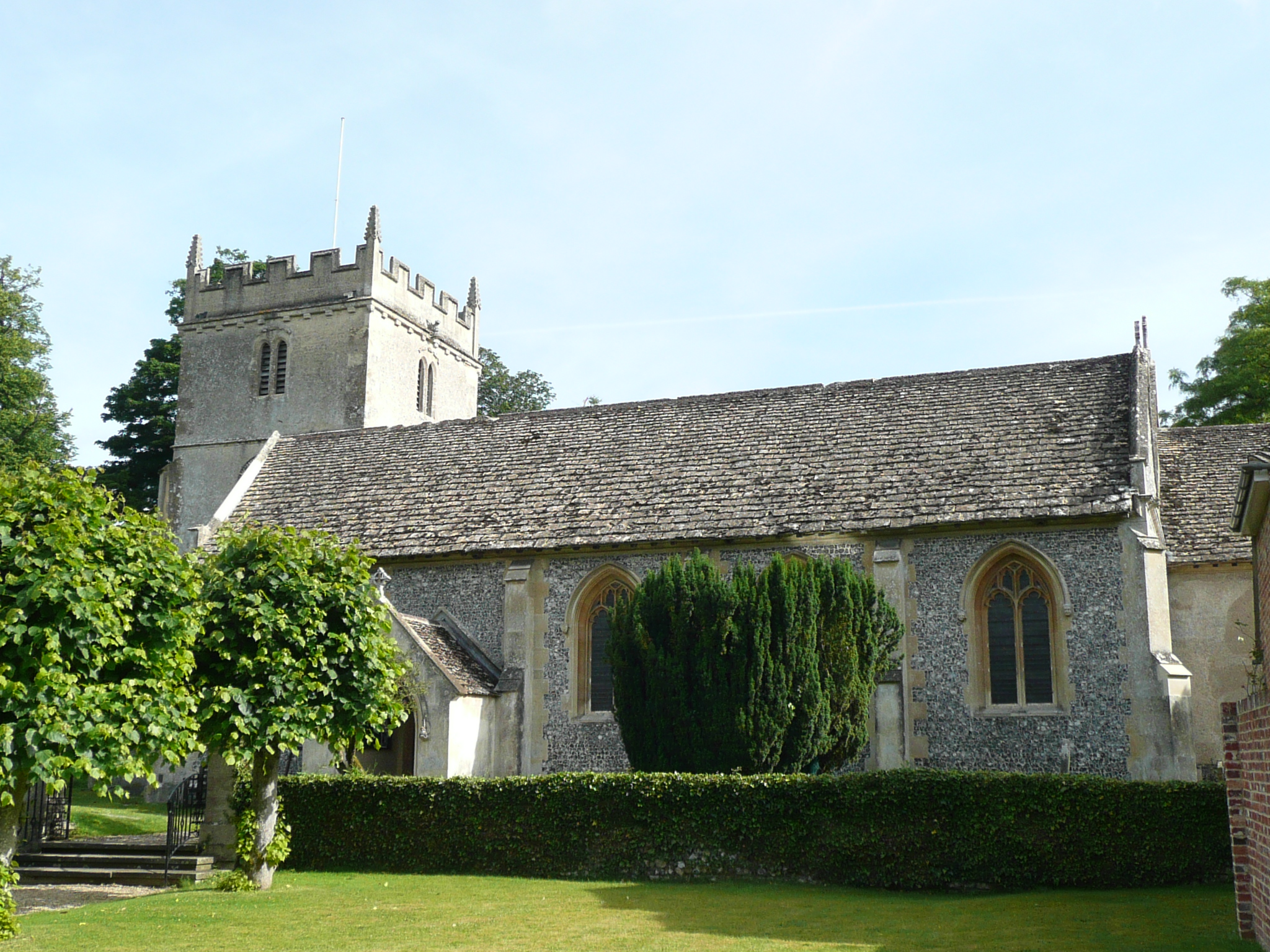
St. Mary's parish church

The Church of England parish church of Saint Mary dates from c. 1300. Restoration by Benjamin Ferrey in 1845 included the addition of a south aisle. The church was designated as Grade II* listed in 1966.

The churchyard has an early 19th-century mausoleum to the Pearse family, designed by William Pilkington and described by Pevsner as "heaviest Grecian".

The church was the location of the 2008 memorial service for Gerald Ward, godfather to Prince Harry; the service was attended by the Prince with the Prince of Wales and the Duchess of Cornwall.

A Wesleyan Methodist chapel was built in 1796, enlarged in 1932 and closed in 1988. The building is now a private house.

== Notable buildings ==
Houses in the village include Vine Cottage, from the late 17th century. The Old Rectory, close to the church, is from the mid 18th century. Bridge House carries a date of 1766 but incorporates earlier work.

The gateway leading to Chilton Lodge, and part of its parkland, are within the parish. The house itself, built in 1800 and Grade II* listed, is now in West Berkshire. It replaced an earlier house on the Wiltshire side of the county boundary, which was demolished. Chilton Park Farm, a house in neo-Georgian style, was built on that site in 1940; nearby is an early 18th-century barn. The Chilton estate is owned by Sarah Scrope, heiress to Sir John and Lady Ward.

Littlecote House, a Grade I listed country house completed in 1592, now a hotel and leisure centre, is 1 mile (1.6 km) upstream on the other site of the Kennet in Ramsbury parish. Part of its estate is in Chilton Foliat parish.

== Notable residents ==
Littlecote House was the seat of Sir Ernest Salter Wills, 3rd Baronet of Hazelwood, a member of the Wills tobacco family dynasty.

Auberon Waugh lived at the Old Rectory from 1964 to 1971.

Max Hastings, journalist, historian and author, lives here.

== Amenities ==
The village has a public house, the Wheatsheaf (in an early 19th-century thatched house) and a village hall (dating from 1895).

A Church of England primary school serves Chilton Foliat and nearby villages. A National School opened in 1835, and in 1847 moved to the north side of the main street. In 1970 the school moved to a new building at Stag Hill.

Much of the Kennet floodplain within the parish has been designated as a Site of Special Scientific Interest (SSSI), owing to the presence of the rare Desmoulin's whorl snail. An area of watermeadow southwest of the village, Chilton Foliat Meadows, is also an SSSI for its diverse flora and variety of birds.

== Television appearances ==
The 1987 BBC Television programme The Victorian Kitchen Garden, featuring head gardener Harry Dodson (1919–2005), was filmed at Chilton Lodge which lies between Chilton Foliat and the Berkshire hamlet of Leverton.

Chilton Foliat is referred to in the 2001 HBO series Band of Brothers as the location where Captain Herbert Sobel was sent to train non-combat military support personnel who needed paratrooper training.

== Sources ==
- Williamson, E.; Baggs, A.P.; Freeman, Jane; Smith, C.; Stevenson, Janet H. (1999). Crowley, D.A. (ed.). A History of the County of Wiltshire: Volume 16: Kinwardstone hundred. Victoria County History. pp. 88–109.
