= Chilton Lodge =

Listed country house in Berkshire, England

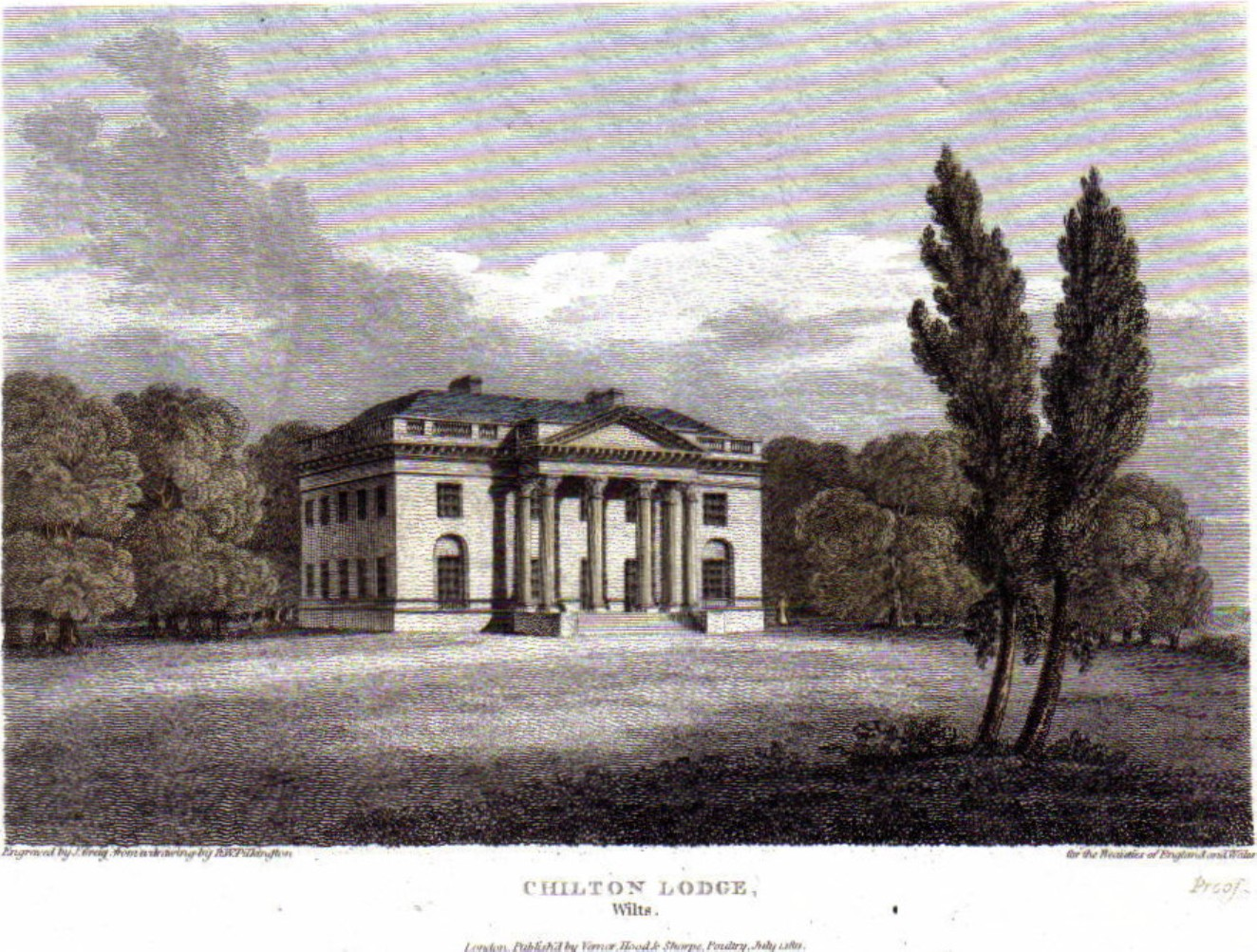
- Chilton Lodge in c. 1814

- Location within Berkshire

General information
- Type: Country house
- Architectural style: Georgian
- Location: Leverton, Berkshire, England
- Coordinates: 51°25′59″N 1°31′38″W
- Year built: 1800
- Renovated: 1892
- Client: John Pearse

Design and construction
- Architect: William Pilkington

Renovating team
- Architect: Sir Arthur Blomfield

Website
- www.chiltonestate.org

Listed Building – Grade II*
- Official name: Chilton Lodge
- Designated: 9 September 1951; 74 years ago
- Reference no.: 1211296

Listed Building – Grade II
- Official name: Stable blocks at Chilton Lodge
- Designated: 7 June 1984; 42 years ago
- Reference no.: 1211297

Listed Building – Grade II
- Official name: Terrace and steps to south of Chilton Lodge
- Designated: 7 June 1984; 42 years ago
- Reference no.: 1212048

Listed Building – Grade II
- Official name: Pedestrian gate and piers to Chilton Lodge on base 300 metres east of main entrance
- Designated: 7 June 1984; 42 years ago
- Reference no.: 1289723

Listed Building – Grade II
- Official name: Gatehouse to Chilton Lodge
- Designated: 6 March 1985; 41 years ago
- Reference no.: 1034109

Listed Building – Grade II
- Official name: Gates to Chilton Lodge
- Designated: 6 March 1985; 41 years ago
- Reference no.: 1365482

Chilton Lodge is an English country house. It is a historic Grade II* listed building. The house is located northwest of Leverton in the parish of Hungerford, in the West Berkshire district, in the ceremonial county of Berkshire. Its park extends into Wiltshire where one gate is just outside Chilton Foliat.

== History ==
=== 16th and 17th century ===
In 1574 the property that was then referred to as "Chilton Park" was split from older estates Calcot Manor and Chilton Foliat Manor by Edward Manners, 3rd Earl of Rutland who had inherited the property through his other title, the 14th Baron de Ros. At this point, there was already a lodge in the Wiltshire portion of this property, near where the current Park Farm stands. The newly split Chilton Park was purchased by Sir Anthony Hinton (1532–1598) of Earlscourt (Earlscote) Manor outside of Wanborough, Wiltshire. Chilton Park became the Hinton family home. Sir Anthony's son, Sir Thomas Hinton (1574–1635) was the High Sheriff of Berkshire in 1612–13 and was a Member of Parliament twice between 1621 and 1625. Hinton was also one of the major investors in the Virginia Company, and the Hinton family subsequently developed close ties with Virginia.

In 1639 Sir Thomas's son Sir Anthony Hinton (1596–1647) sold the property to Thomas Hussey (1597–1657).

The Hussey family ended up in significant financial distress, and so in 1663, Thomas's son, Willam Hussey, sold the Chilton property to Sir Bulstrode Whitelocke, Keeper of the Great Seal during the Commonwealth.

Whitelocke died at Chilton in 1675 and left the estate to Samuel, the oldest son of his third wife.

=== 18th century ===
The Whitelocke family held the property until 1767. They sold it to John Zephaniah Holwell (1711–1798), a nabob, survivor of the Black Hole of Calcutta (1756), and the author of its most famous account. He had also been governor of Bengal in 1760. In 1771 Holwell sold the estate to another returnee from India, General Richard Smith (1734–1803). Smith, the former commander-in-chief of the East India Company in Bengal, had retired in 1770, and reportedly returned to England with £300,000 (equivalent to £47,307,255 in 2025). While residing at Chilton, Smith spent much of his time standing for, or serving in Parliament.

Smith reportedly gambled much of his massive fortune away, and in 1785 was obliged to sell the estate to John Macnamara (1756–1818). Macnamara was also a notorious gambler and playboy. In 1788 Macnamara sold Chilton back to the mortgagees William Morland (1739–1815) and Thomas Hammersley, bankers of Pall Mall. In 1789 Hammersley released his interest to Morland.

In 1789 Morland commissioned the architect Sir John Soane to demolish and rebuild the 16th-century house. This new house was completed around 1793. Soane's plans show a villa with a two-storeyed centre and short single-storeyed wings. The new house was most likely built on the foundations of the old house and reused some materials from it. Other materials from the old house were auctioned in 1791.

In 1796 the estate was purchased by John Pearse (1759–1836) whose family had been extremely successful in the fabric and clothing business, particularly in supplying the military. In addition to the family business, Pearse was on the board of the Bank of England, eventually becoming its governor in 1812, and was a Member of Parliament from 1818 to 1832.

=== 19th century ===
In 1800 Pearse had the roughly 7-year-old Soane-designed house pulled down and hired architect William Pilkington to design the current Chilton Lodge. There does not appear to be any clear indication why Soane's house was demolished so soon after it was built. Pearse also assembled the park that currently surrounds the lodge. The new house was built to the east of the old one—in Berkshire, and roughly in the centre of the park. By 1813 he owned a total of 1,488 acres (602 ha) in the parish.

In 1834 Pearse sold the estate to the Rev. Sir William Henry Cooper (1766–1835), son of the Secretary to the Treasury (1765–1782) Grey Cooper. Rev. Cooper had been a Prebendary of Rochester Cathedral from 1793 to 1797, and, in 1803, chaplain to George III. Cooper died in 1835, leaving the house to his wife Isabella. From her very wealthy family, Isabella had inherited Isleworth House, a mansion on the banks of the River Thames in Isleworth, Middlesex, and it seems that she spent her time there, so Chilton Lodge was rented during this period. When Isabella died in 1855, she left the property to her and Sir William's grandson, William Honywood. Honywood does not seem to have lived in Chilton Lodge either. For example, The Times notes that Major-General Randal Rumley died in an accident while visiting a Mr. William Butler at Chilton Lodge in 1884.

Honywood sold the property in 1890 to Sir William Pearce (1861–1907). Pearce was the son of famed shipbuilder Sir William Pearce, 1st Baronet, who had founded and was chairman of Fairfield Shipbuilding and Engineering Company in Govan, Scotland. In 1888 the younger William Pearce succeeded his father as chairman. He was also a keen sportsman and often held shooting parties at Chilton Lodge.

Pearce died relatively young, and his wife died only a month later. Since they were without children, Pearce's will directed that the Chilton estate be sold and the proceeds given to Trinity College, Cambridge.

=== 20th and 21st centuries ===
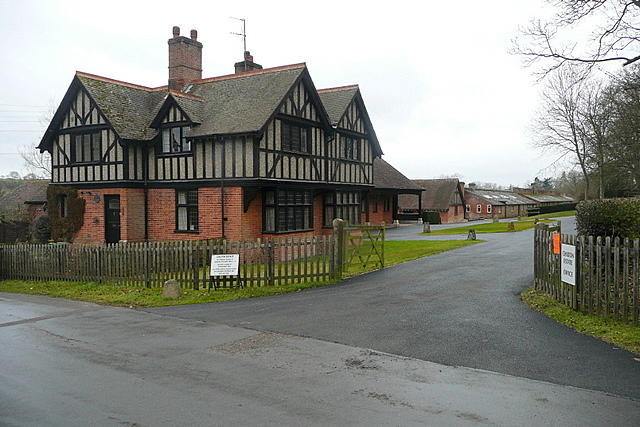
Entrance to Chilton Lodge

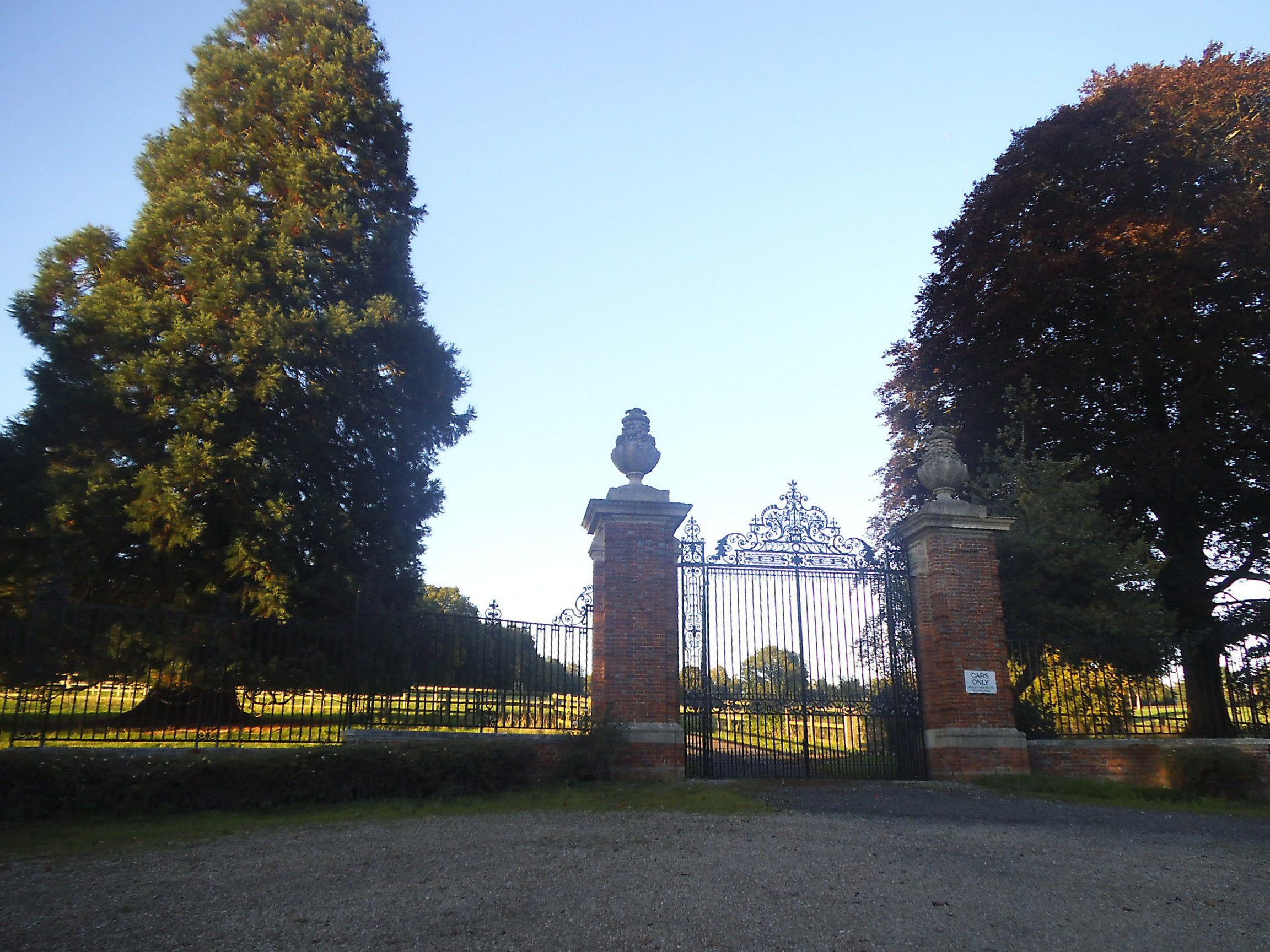
Grade II listed gate on Leverton Lane

In 1909 the estate was bought by U.S. Ambassador to the United Kingdom Whitelaw Reid as a wedding present for his daughter Jean Templeton Reid (1884–1962) and her new husband Sir John Hubert Ward (1870–1938).

Their younger son, Alexander Reginald "Reggie" Ward (1914–1987), co-founded Chilton Aircraft in 1936. The company was headquartered in a small factory in Chilton's coach house. They designed and built aircraft such as the Chilton D.W.1 and the Chilton Olympia. Like many other country houses, during World War II Chilton Lodge was loaned out to the war effort. American forces belonging to the 101st Airborne Division, flying from RAF Ramsbury and RAF Welford, used both the house and the park. After the war, Chilton Aircraft became Chilton Electrics, and in the late 1950s, it moved to newly built premises in Church Way Hungerford.

The walled gardens at Chilton Lodge were made famous by the 1987 BBC2 television series, The Victorian Kitchen Garden, co-presented by Harry Dodson. Dodson was head gardener at the house from 1947 to 1981 and had been given life-rights to the garden property on the estate. The series' premise involved Dodson rehabilitating part of the property's largely derelict garden over a year. The series was very successful and spawned several sequels starring Dodson.

As of 2024 the estate is still owned and managed by members of the Ward family.

== Architecture ==
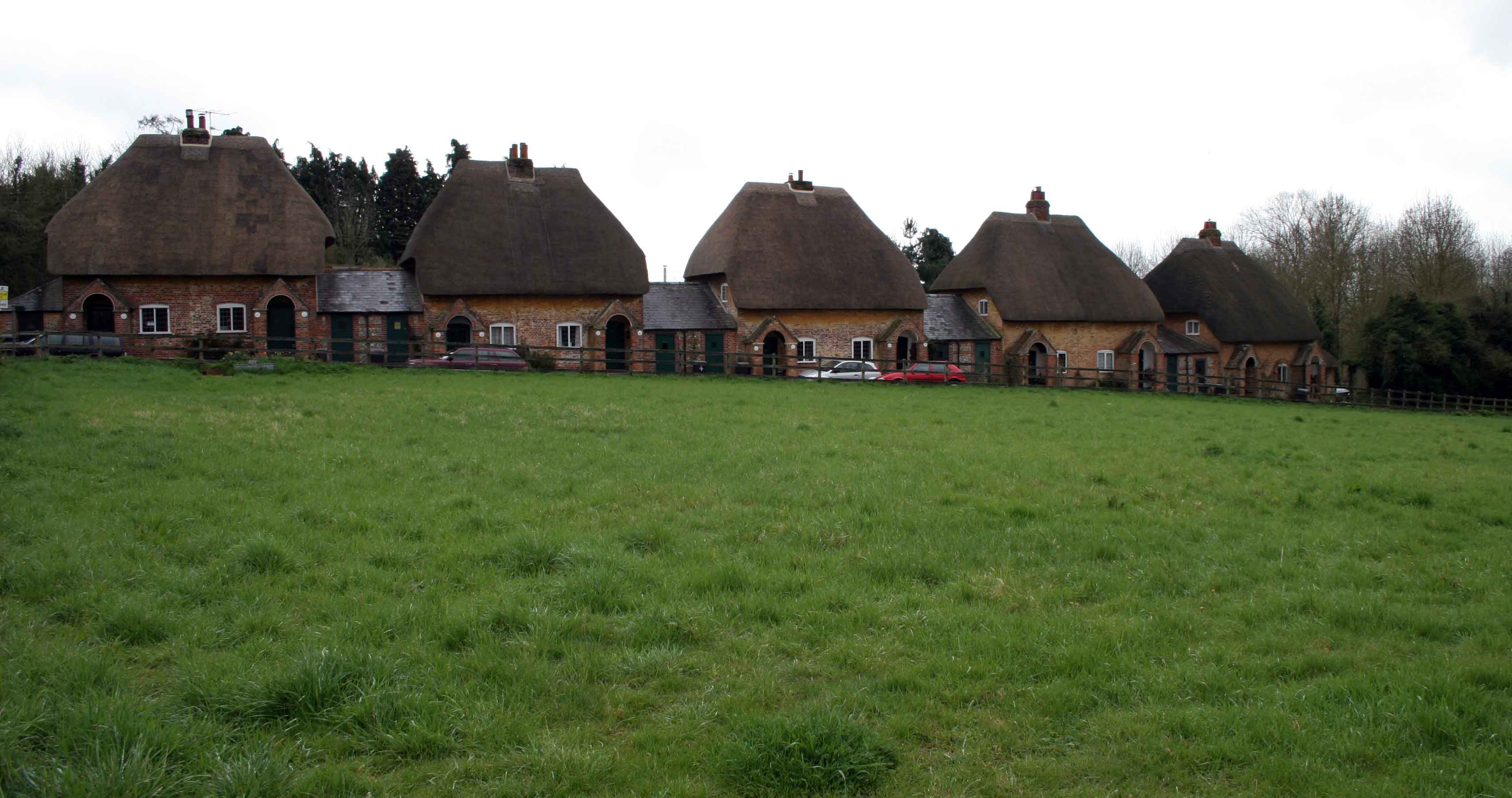
Pepperpot Cottages

The current house was designed by William Pilkington for John Pearse and was completed in 1800. The main south front of the house has five bays and a full-height Corinthian portico. The north side has an extensive stable court, and the east front has seven bays.

The mansion was enlarged and almost completely reconstructed between 1890 and 1892 by Sir William Pearce, including a second storey for servants and a 'carriage porch – porte-cochère' on the east side, designed by Sir Arthur Blomfield.

The nearby estate village in Leverton has a picturesque range of six unique thatched cottages in pepperpot shapes, originally inhabited by the estate workers.

The park was designed for John Pearse by Sir Humphry Repton at the same time the current house was built. In the book, Repton's Landscape Gardening and Landscape Architecture, Repton states that he was brought onto the project by Pilkington. Interestingly, despite the demolition of the house he had designed, Sir John Soane appears to have been involved in Pearse's rework of the park and property. Soane's drawings contain plans for a greenhouse at Chilton.

== See also ==
- Grade II* listed buildings in Berkshire
