= Bagnor =

Coordinates: 51°25′19″N 1°21′04″W

- Village
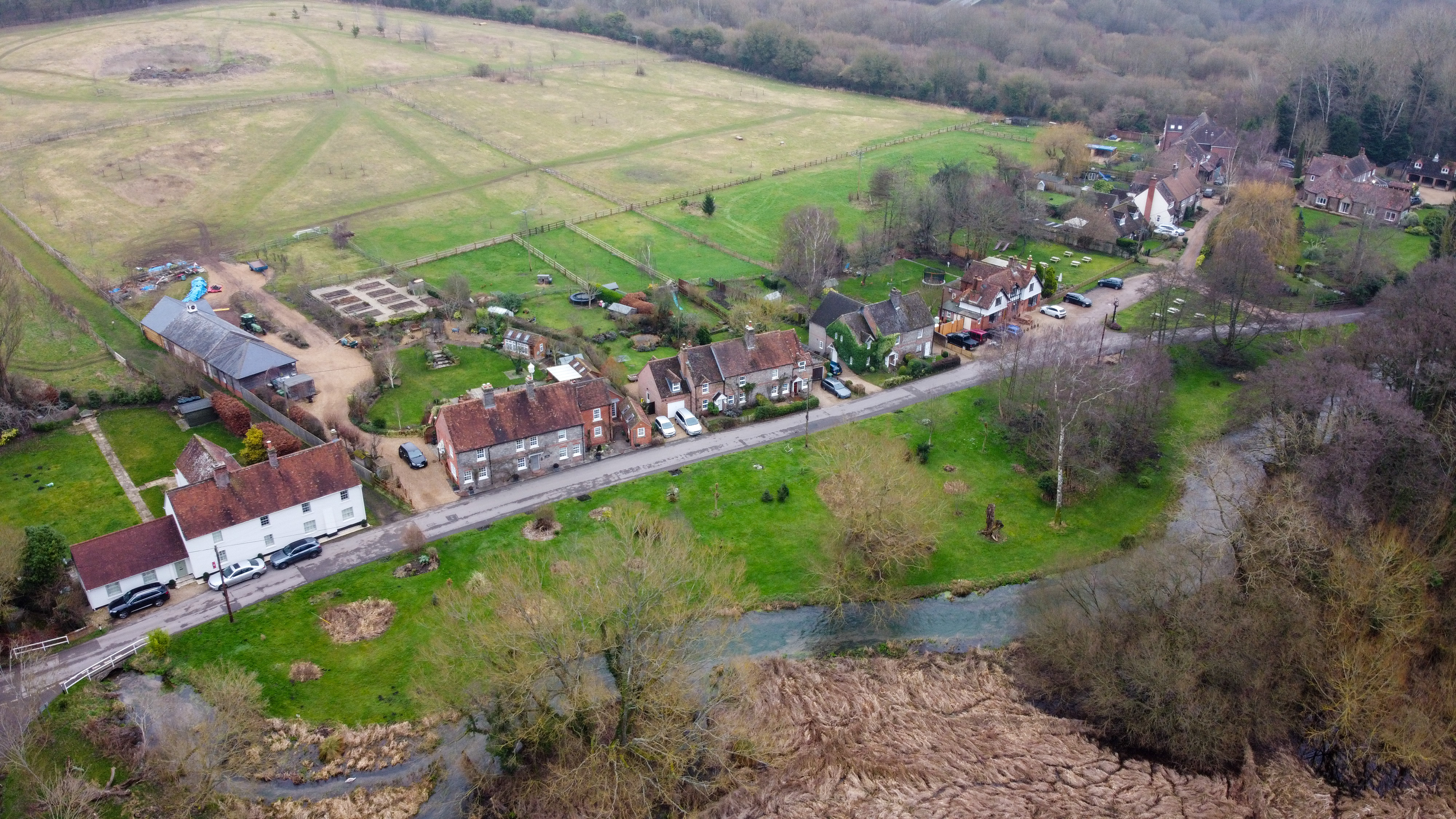
- Houses in Bagnor, with the River Lambourn in the foreground

- Location within Berkshire
- OS grid reference: SU452692
- Unitary authority: West Berkshire
- Ceremonial county: Berkshire
- Region: South East
- Country: England
- Sovereign state: United Kingdom
- Post town: Newbury
- Postcode district: RG20
- Dialling code: 01635
- Police: Thames Valley
- Fire: Royal Berkshire
- Ambulance: South Central
- UK Parliament: Newbury

Bagnor is a village close to the town of Newbury in the English county of Berkshire and situated on the banks of the River Lambourn. At the 2011 census the population was included in the civil parish of Speen. It is best known as the home of the Watermill Theatre.

== Geography ==
Bagnor is located in West Berkshire. It is near the villages of Speen, Donnington, Boxford, and Winterbourne, as well as the hamlet of Honey Bottom. It is located within the North Wessex Downs National Landscape. Donnington Castle, a significant site in the history of the First English Civil War, lies less than a mile to the east.

== History ==
Bagnor was recorded in the Domesday Book as Bagenore.

"Humphrey the Chamberlain holds Bagenore from the King. Wulfeva held it freehold from King Edward. Then it answered for 4 hides; now 1 hide. Land for 3 ploughs: In hardship 1 (plough) 3 villagers and 3 smallholders with 2 ploughs. 1 slave: a water mill at 20s meadow 22 acres: woodland at 4 pigs".

The Blackbird public house has stood in the village since the 17th century.

=== Bagnor Manor ===
Bagnor Manor is a country house standing near the centre of the village. The house in its current form dates from the 17th century. At the time of Domesday Book, the manor house and its estate had been held for the Crown. Ownership was later transferred to Henry de Bagenore, who sold the property to Poughley Priory and convent in 1232. The transfer was agreed in return for a yearly payment of 8 marks, food and clothing for Henry's two sons, and an agreement that the Prior would find a suitor for his youngest daughter, Celestria.

The priory was dissolved in c.1524 and its lands seized by Henry VIII. The manor house was granted to Wolsey College, later Christ Church, Oxford in 1531. Bagnor Manor was later transferred to the Dean and Chapter of Westminster in return for lands in St. James's Park. They built the present Grade II listed building in the 17th century, but the estate did not pass into private ownership until 1871, when it was purchased by the wealthy Grove family from Donnington. Until 2007 it was home to the art collector and property developer Peter Palumbo, who installed many artworks in the house and grounds. It is now a private residence.

== Local government ==
Bagnor forms part of the civil parish of Speen, which is itself part of the district administered by the unitary authority of West Berkshire.

== Watermill Theatre ==
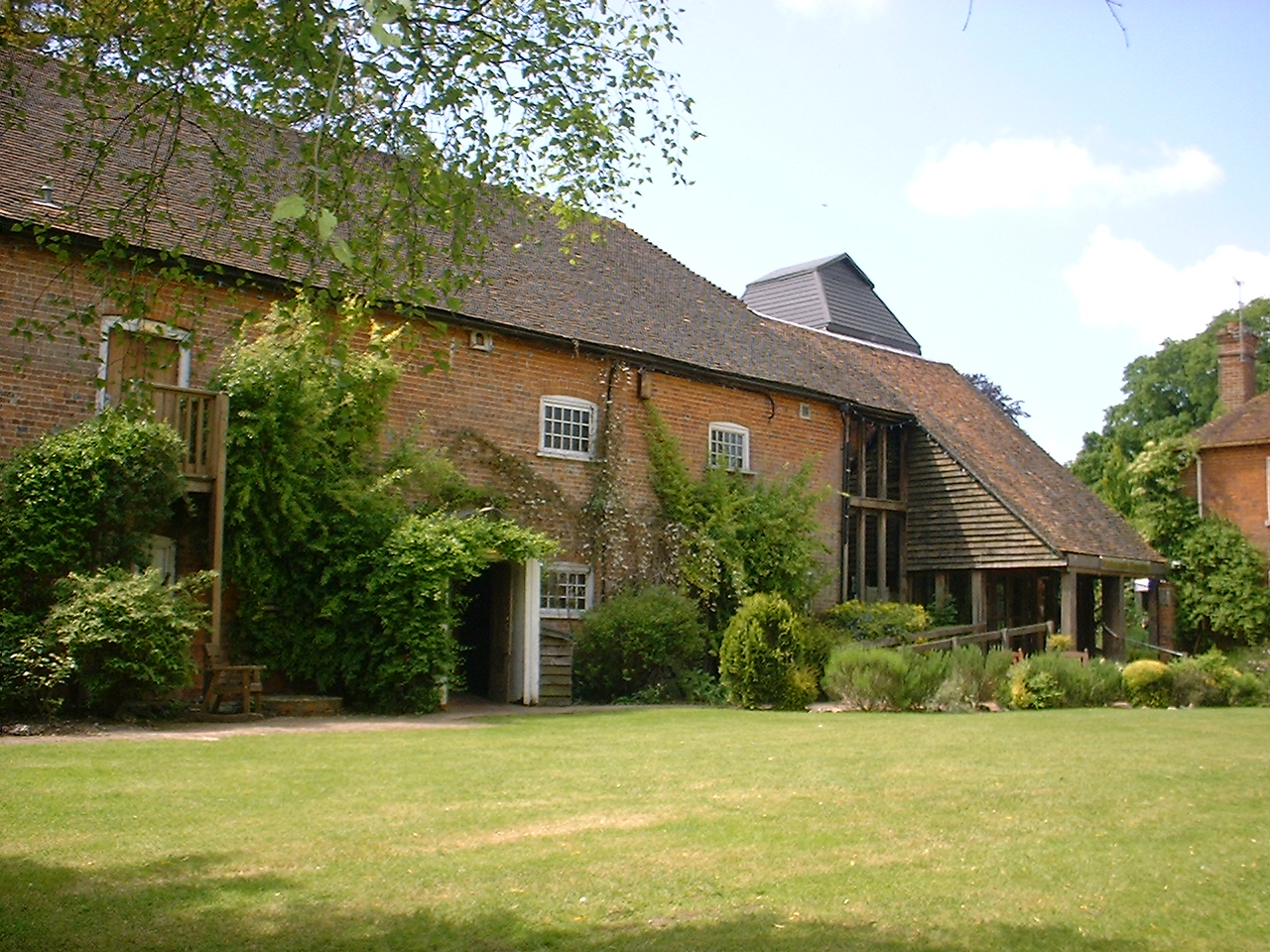
Watermill Theatre

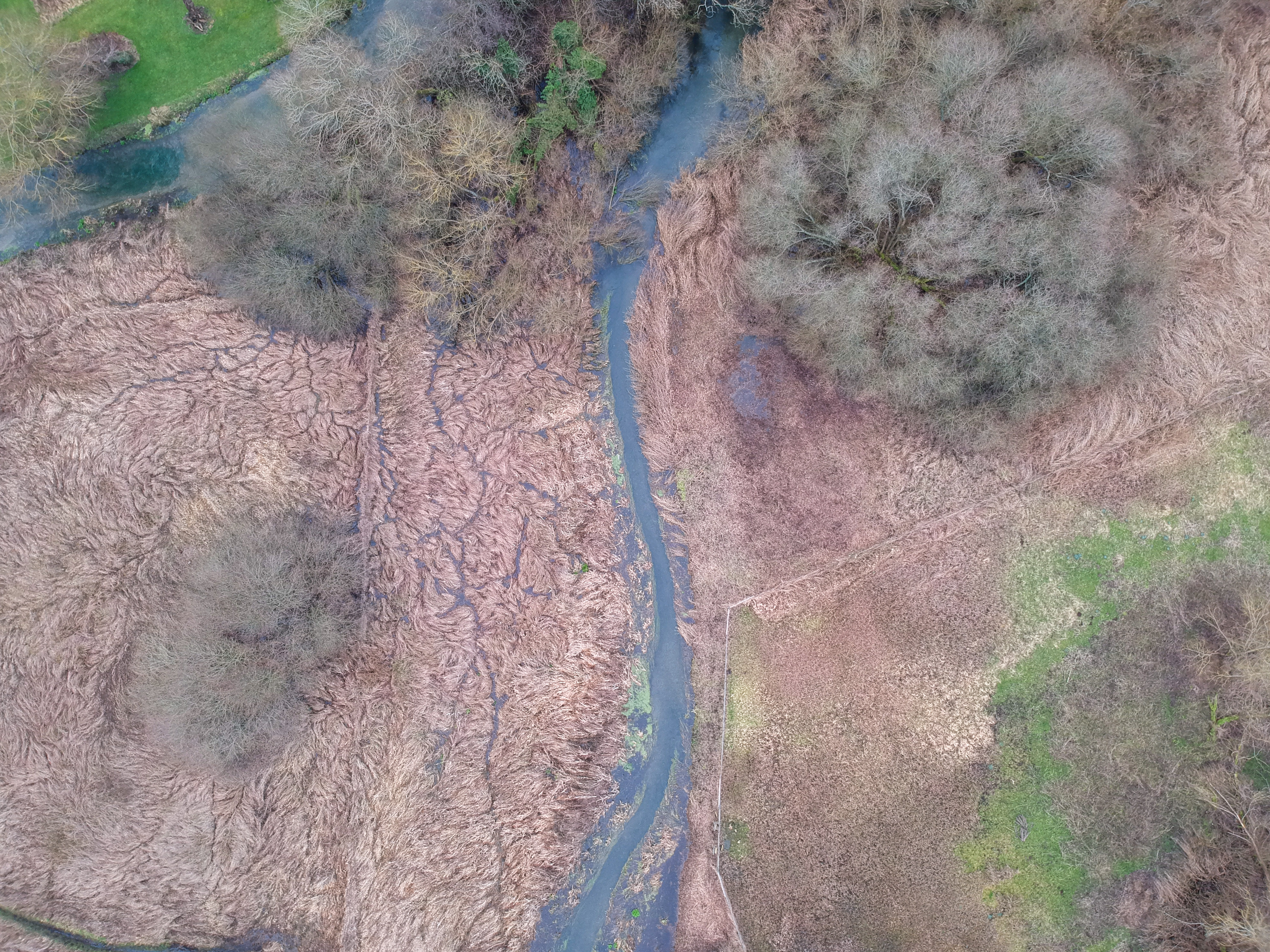
Aerial view of Rack Marsh, Bagnor, as seen in winter.

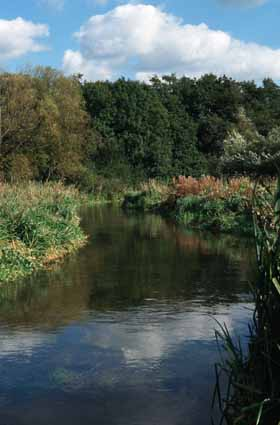
River Lambourn flowing through Rack Marsh to the south of Bagnor

The Watermill Theatre is a privately owned repertory theatre that has operated since 1967. It is a converted watermill with gardens beside the River Lambourn, and seats 220 people. It retains many of its original architectural features including the waterwheel, which can be viewed through a glass screen on entering the auditorium. Many successful actors have begun their careers at the Watermill Theatre, most notably Sean Bean, Bill Nighy and David Suchet. It is one of only five theatres to have been awarded a National Touring remit by Arts Council England, and previous productions have subsequently moved to Broadway and the West End.

== Rack Marsh ==
Rack Marsh is a small local nature reserve in the village which is managed by BBOWT. As part of the Kennet and Lambourn floodplain it is designated as a Site of Special Scientific Interest (SSSI). It was the scene of protests during the construction of the Newbury bypass which passes to the east of the village. This was partly due to the presence on the reserve of the rare Desmoulin's whorl snail.

== Notable residents ==
A number of notable individuals have lived in the village or its immediate surroundings. They include:

- Jill Fraser MBE, theatre owner and director, who was artistic director of the Watermill Theatre from 1981 to 2006.
- Lord Hanson, industrialist, who lived on the outskirts of the village.
- Jack Hargreaves, television presenter and author, who bought and converted Brook House on the Winterbourne in 1948, moving on to Lymington in 1960.
- Sir Michael Hordern, actor best known for his performances of Shakespeare, and as the voice of Paddington Bear in the eponymous BBC television series.
- George Melly, jazz musician and writer
- Peter Palumbo, property developer and art collector, who lived in Bagnor Manor.

== See also ==
- List of places in Berkshire
