= Honey Bottom =

Hamlet in Berkshire, England

Coordinates: 51.430729°N 1.347461°W

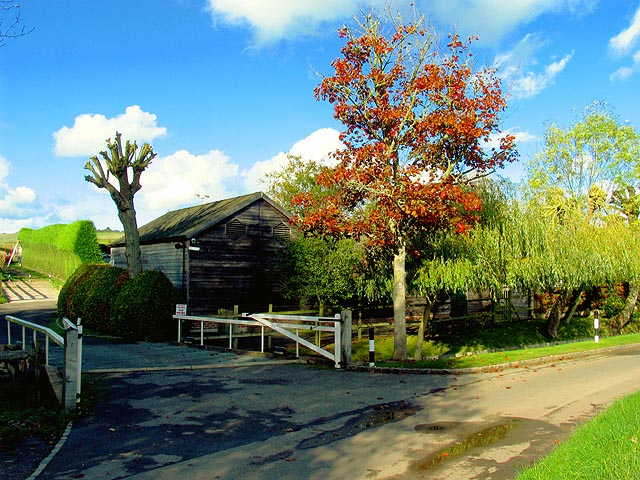

- Location within Berkshire
- OS grid reference: SU453704
- Metropolitan borough: West Berkshire
- Metropolitan county: Berkshire
- Region: South East
- Country: England
- Sovereign state: United Kingdom
- Post town: NEWBURY
- Postcode district: RG14
- Dialling code: 01635
- Police: Thames Valley
- Fire: Royal Berkshire
- Ambulance: South Central
- UK Parliament: Berkshire

Honey Bottom (also written as Honeybottom) is a hamlet in the civil parish of Shaw-cum-Donnington in the English county of Berkshire.

The settlement lies approximately 2.5 miles (4.0 km) north-west of the town of Newbury, between the villages of Bagnor and Winterbourne. It covers the very north-eastern portion of the Donnington half of the parish of Shaw-cum-Donnington, on the southern edge of Snelsmore Common.
