= Ruth Mott =

Television cook (1917–2012)

- Mott in her role in the BBC's Wartime Kitchen and Garden
- Born: Mildred Ruth Pizzey; 5 February 1917; Yattendon, England
- Died: 28 July 2012 (aged 95)
- Occupations: domestic servant television cook
- Spouse: Bill Mott (1942–1959) (his death)
- Children: Bertha Mott

Ruth Mott (5 February 1917 – 28 July 2012) was an English domestic servant who became a television cook and personality. Mott spent most of her life working in country houses with her television work not beginning until the age of 70, when her knowledge of a working Victorian kitchen was used for the television show The Victorian Kitchen.

== Biography ==
Mott was born Mildred Ruth Pizzey in Yattendon in Berkshire, England, in 1917 to Alfred Pizzey, a gardener, and Bertha (née Sparkes), the youngest of three children. As a child she attended the local school, which was designed by the English architect Alfred Waterhouse.

When she left school, at the age of 14, she became a kitchen and scullery maid for the Manor House, owned by the Waterhouse family. Mott was part of a staff of eight, with a wage of £1 and 5 shillings a month. A year later, in 1932, staff cuts saw Mott leaving the employment of the Waterhouse family, finding alternative work in nearby Frilsham House. In 1936 she moved, this time to Lavington Park in Sussex, before circumstances saw her take up employment for Countess Iveagh at Elveden Hall in Thetford.

In 1941, Mott took work at a house in Ashampstead to be closer to her parents, both of them then suffering from ill health, in Yattendon. In 1942, she married Cecil Ronald "Bill" Mott, whom she had known since her teen years. Bill was serving in the British Army at the time. They moved in with her parents to take care of them and Mott took a job collecting insurance premiums for Prudential.

When her daughter Bertha was born in 1945, Mott became a housewife, only returning to employment in 1957 when Bertha was in school. Mott took an office job in the day, and catered for local functions in her free time.

Bill died in 1959. Mott continued in her catering and office work until 1970 when she was offered a full-time role as cook-housekeeper at Basildon Park near Pangbourne for Lord and Lady Iliffe. Mott continued to work full-time at Basildon Park until 1987, when she was 70, although she did casual work for the household after this date.

Mott died on 28 July 2012 and was survived by her daughter.

== Television career ==
At the age of 70, Mott replied to an appeal, printed in the Women's Institute journal Home and Country, for women who had worked in country houses before the Second World War, especially those who had experience of Victorian methods of cooking. The BBC wished to build on the success of the television show The Victorian Kitchen Garden, which explored how a country garden would be run during Victorian Britain. The second series was called The Victorian Kitchen, and this explored how the produce grown in the garden, by series gardener Harry Dodson, would be cooked using Victorian methods.

Mott described the methods she once used, such as plucking birds, skinning hares and using coal-range roasting spits, in her response to the Home and Country notice. The BBC offered her an audition, then hired her for the role as the head cook. She was joined on the show by Alison Arnison, who took on the duties of Mott's kitchen maid.

With no script and using turns of phrase, Mott spoke to the camera describing bygone methods of preparing and cooking food. She was a success with the viewers, who took to her stories and personality, and the fact that Mott, with her ample figure, strong Berkshire accent and capable abilities, epitomised the positive stereotype of a country cook.

Mott then found herself in demand with Britain's most popular chat shows and her fame spread when the television series was shown abroad. Mott contributed to a book accompanying the series and in 1990 followed this up with her own book, Ruth Mott's Favourite Recipes. Mott returned to the BBC in 1993, becoming the "wartime" cook in The Wartime Kitchen and Garden, with Ruth Mott's Country Christmas airing in December 1995. Mott's reputation as a historical cook resulted in her taking on the role as a consultant for Robert Altman's 2001 film Gosford Park.
