= Rack Marsh =

Nature reserve in Berkshire, England

Rack Marsh (Kennet and Lambourn Floodplain)
- Site of Special Scientific Interest
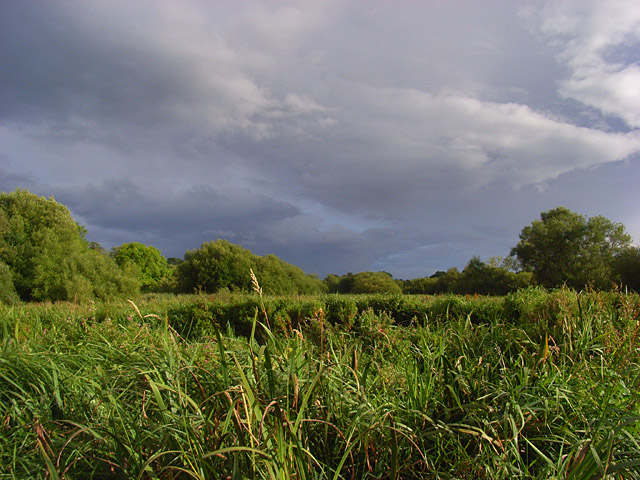

- Location within Berkshire
- Location of Rack Marsh (Kennet and Lambourn Floodplain).
- Area of search: Bagnor, Berkshire
- Grid reference: Grid reference SU322798
- Coordinates: 51°25′13″N 1°21′04″W
- Interest: Biological
- Area: 4 hectares (9.9 acres)
- Notification date: 1996
- Location map: DEFRA

Rack Marsh is a 4-hectare (9.9-acre) nature reserve in Bagnor, on the north-western outskirts of Newbury in Berkshire. It is managed by the Berkshire, Buckinghamshire and Oxfordshire Wildlife Trust. It is part of Kennet and Lambourn Floodplain, which is a Biological Site of Special Scientific Interest, and a Nature Conservation Review site. It is also part of the Kennet and Lambourn Floodplain Special Area of Conservation.

== Geography and site ==
Rack Marsh is an old wet meadow. A thick layer of peat has developed on top of the deposits of alluvium and gravel which the river has spread over the chalk. The river Lambourn flows through the meadow.

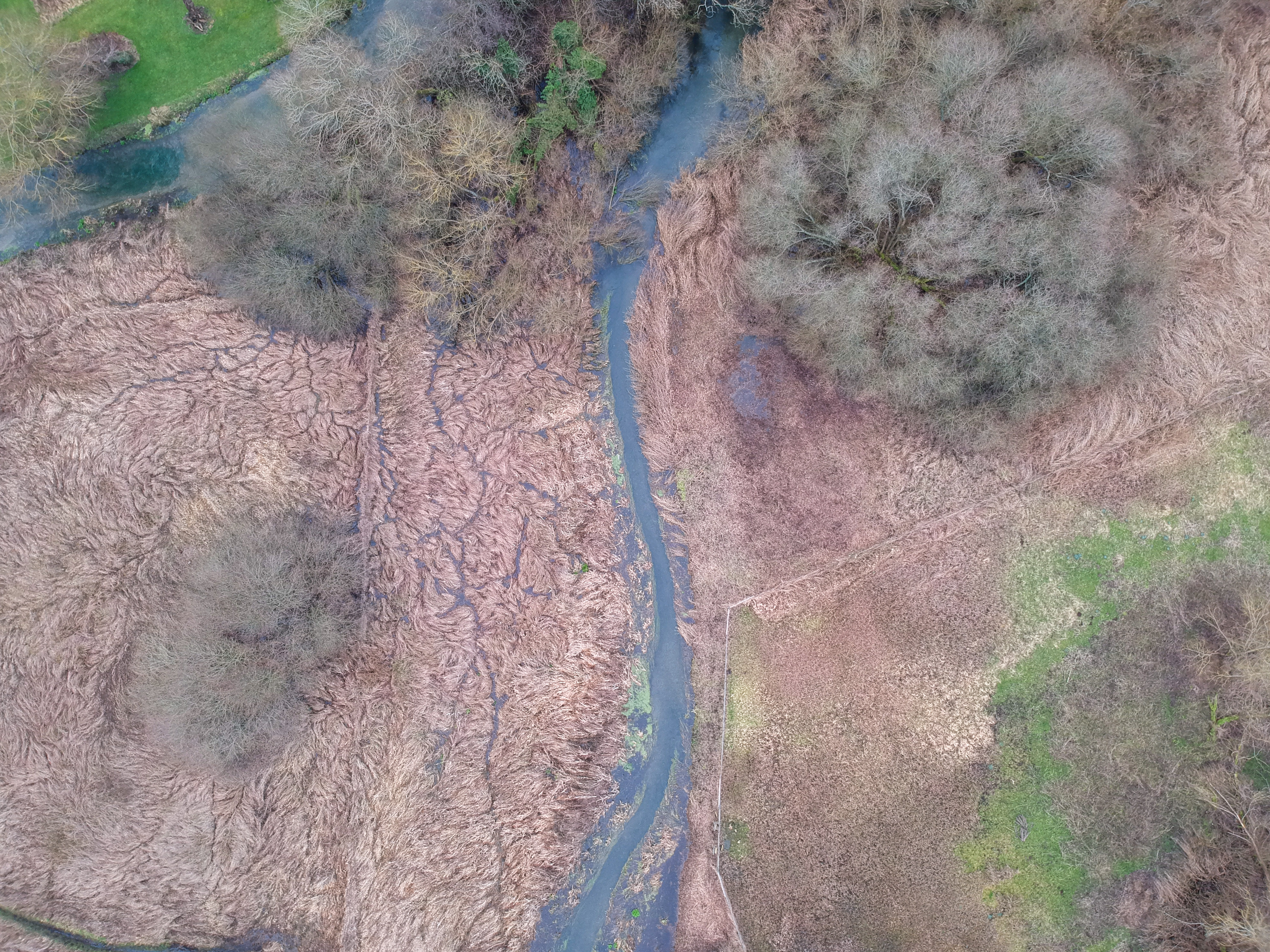
Aerial view of Rack Marsh, Bagnor, as seen in winter.

== History ==
There is evidence of prehistoric activity in the area: a prehistoric canoe was discovered in the layer of peat by some labourers who were digging a ditch to form a boundary of a garden.

In 1996 the discovery of the rare Desmoulin's whorl snail on the reserve meant that the Newbury bypass was almost stopped, but the high court ruled in the developers' favour. The decision to continue with the construction of the road meant that the nature reserve was cut in size, losing half its area.

== Fauna ==
The site has the following fauna:

=== Invertebrates ===
- Desmoulin's whorl snail

=== Birds ===
- Common chiffchaff
- Grey heron
- Common kingfisher
- Eurasian reed warbler
- Sedge warbler
- Common whitethroat
- Barn owl

== Flora ==
The site has the following flora:

=== Plants ===
- Filipendula ulmaria
- Trifolium pratense
- Lychnis flos-cuculi
- Caltha palustris
- Scutellaria galericulata
- Geum rivale
- Scrophularia auriculata
- Myosotis scorpioides
- Mentha aquatica
- Angelica sylvestris
- Triglochin palustris
- Dactylorhiza praetermissa
- Marsh valerian
