= Thoday =

Thoday is a surname. Notable people with the surname include:

- David Thoday (1883–1964), British botanist, father of John
- John Thoday (1916–2008), British geneticist, son of David
- Peter Thoday (1934–2023), English horticulturalist and TV presenter
- Jon Thoday (active from 1989), British television executive and businessman
