= Randal Rumley =

British Army general

Major-General Randal Rumley
- Born: 12 November 1804; Bath, Somerset, England
- Died: 13 September 1884 (aged 79) near Hungerford, Berkshire
- Military career
- Allegiance: United Kingdom
- Branch: British Army
- Rank: Major-General
- Commands: Commander-in-Chief, Scotland

Major-General Randal Rumley (12 November 1804 – 13 September 1884) was a British Army officer who became Commander-in-Chief, Scotland.

== Military career ==
Rumley was commissioned into the British Army on 20 December 1824 and served for much of his military career in the 60th Rifles. He became Inspector General of Infantry in April 1861. He was despatched to Canada in 1862 to take command of the 2nd Division as the British Government took steps to strengthen its military forces as a result of tensions created by the Trent Affair. Promoted to major-general on 9 November 1862, he went on to command the troops in the North British District, a role that he had taken up by 1868 and retired from in 1873.

Rumley was also colonel of the 27th (Inniskilling) Regiment of Foot from 1870 until its amalgamation into the Royal Inniskilling Fusiliers in 1881, after which he was Colonel of the 1st Battalion of the new regiment until 1884. He was then made Colonel of the 1st Battalion, 60th Regiment of Foot from April 1884 until his death in September 1884.

== Personal life ==
On 30 September 1838, Rumley married Caroline Mary Berkeley, daughter of Sir George Henry Frederick Berkeley, grandson of Augustus Berkeley, 4th Earl of Berkeley.

Rumley was killed in a carriage accident while visiting a Mr. Butler of Chilton Lodge in Leverton, Berkshire.

Military offices
| Preceded by Edward Forestier-Walker | Commanding the troops in the North British District; 1868–1873 | Succeeded by Sir John Douglas |
| Preceded by Sir Arthur Augustus Thurlow Cunynghame | Colonel of the 1st Battalion, 60th Regiment of Foot; 1884–1884 | Succeeded by Edward Arthur Somerset |
| Preceded by New regiment | Colonel of the 1st Battalion, Royal Inniskilling Fusiliers; 1881–1884 | Succeeded by John Neptune Sargent |
| Preceded by James Robertson Craufurd | Colonel of the 27th (Inniskilling) Regiment of Foot; 1870–1881 | Succeeded by Regiment amalgamated into Royal Inniskilling Fusiliers |
