= Chilton Foliat Meadows =

Protected area in England

Coordinates: 51.43083°N 1.54828°W

Chilton Foliat Meadows (grid reference SU315703) is a 54.6 hectare biological Site of Special Scientific Interest in the civil parish of Chilton Foliat in the English county of Wiltshire. It was notified in 1971 and is split across Berkshire and Wiltshire.

== Sources ==
- Natural England citation sheet for the site (accessed 23 March 2022)
