= Winterbourne Chalk Pit =

Site of Special Scientific Interest west of Winterbourne in Berkshire

Coordinates: 51.447°N 1.358°W

- Site of Special Scientific Interest
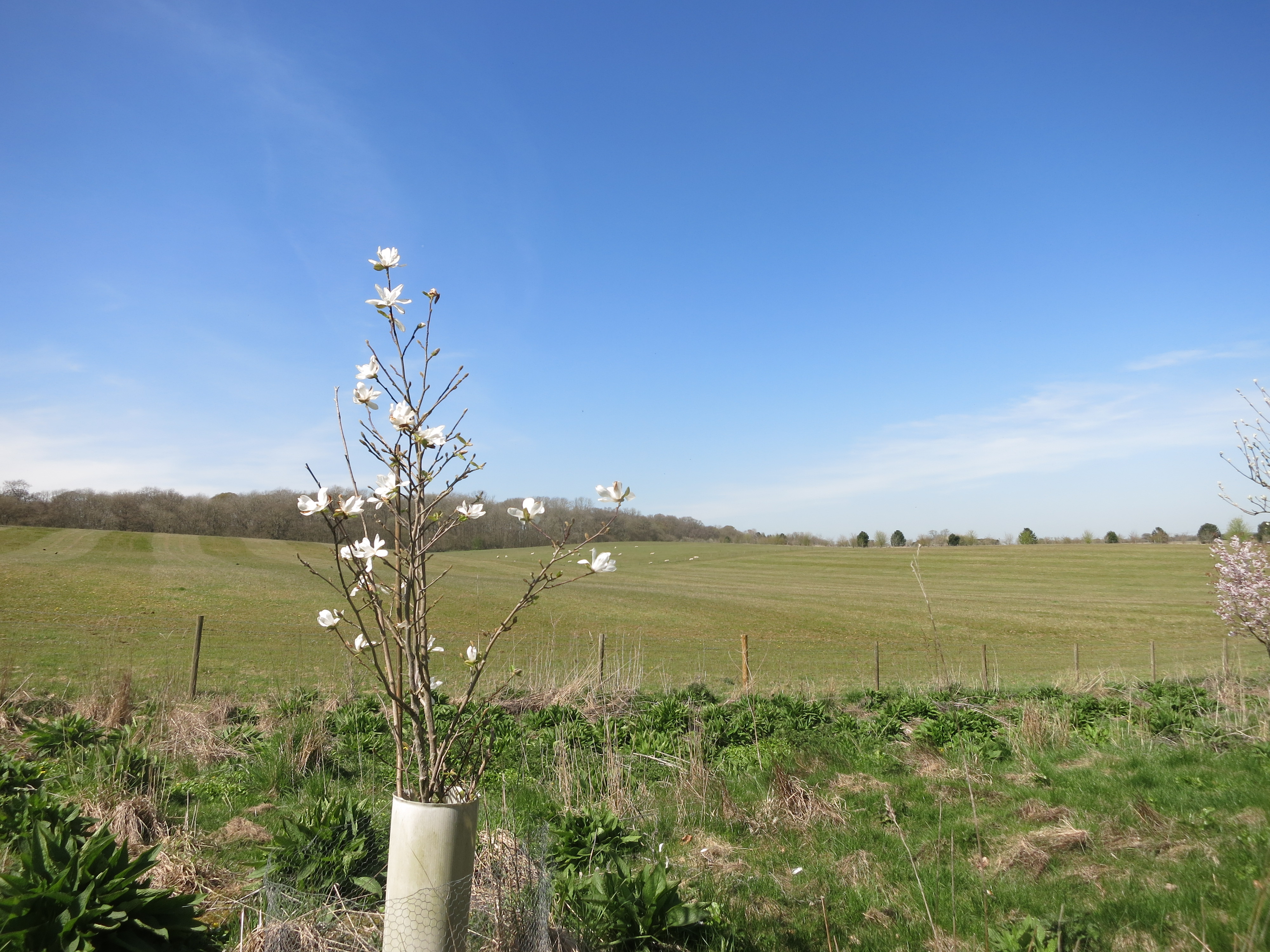
- View towards Winterbourne Chalk Pit
- Location of Winterbourne Chalk Pit.
- Area of search: Berkshire
- Grid reference: SU 447 722
- Interest: Geological
- Area: 0.05 hectares (0.12 acres)
- Notification date: 1983
- Location map: Magic Map

Winterbourne Chalk Pit is a 0.05-hectare (0.12-acre) geological Site of Special Scientific Interest west of Winterbourne in Berkshire. It is a Geological Conservation Review site. It is located within the North Wessex Downs.

The chalk sediments date to the late Cretaceous period, about 80 million years ago. The pit is the only known area containing rocks of this age in the western part of the London Basin. It is rich in macrofossils, particularly belemnites. The site is private land with no public access.
