= The Victorian Kitchen Garden =

Coordinates: 51°25′45.38″N 1°31′26.96″W

- Genre: Gardening
- Based on: an idea by Jennifer Davies
- Directed by: Keith Sheather
- Starring: Peter Thoday; Harry Dodson
- Composer: Paul Reade
- Country of origin: United Kingdom
- Original language: English
- No. of episodes: 13

Production
- Producer: Keith Sheather
- Production locations: Leverton, England
- Production company: BBC

Original release
- Network: BBC2
- Release: 1987

Related
- The Victorian Flower Garden, The Victorian Kitchen, Harry's Big Adventure, The Wartime Kitchen and Garden

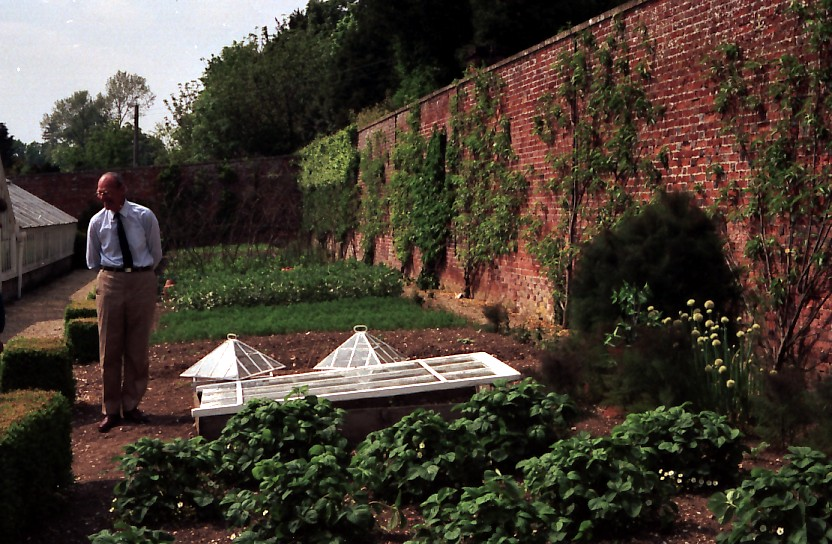
Harry Dodson at the northern wall of The Victorian Kitchen Garden in 1989

The Victorian Kitchen Garden is a 13-part British television series produced in 1987 by Keith Sheather for BBC2, based on an idea by Jennifer Davies, who later became associate producer. It recreated a kitchen garden of the Victorian era at Leverton, Berkshire (near Chilton Foliat, Wiltshire). The presenter was the horticultural lecturer, Peter Thoday, the master gardener was Harry Dodson, and the director was Keith Sheather.

The theme music and soundtrack was composed by Paul Reade and performed principally by Emma Johnson playing the clarinet. It won the 1991 Ivor Novello award for best TV theme music.

== Content ==
The series began in the largely derelict walled garden at Chilton Lodge, and followed Dodson and his assistant, Alison, as they recreated the working kitchen garden.

The work involved many repairs, from replanting the box (Buxus) edging and replacing the gravel walks, to reglazing the cold frames and repairing the Victorian wood-framed, brick-based glass-houses. The team were determined to use plants that the Victorian head gardener would have had available. The programme displayed the various tools and techniques of Victorian gardening. Dodson had used many of both and therefore could demonstrate how they were used.

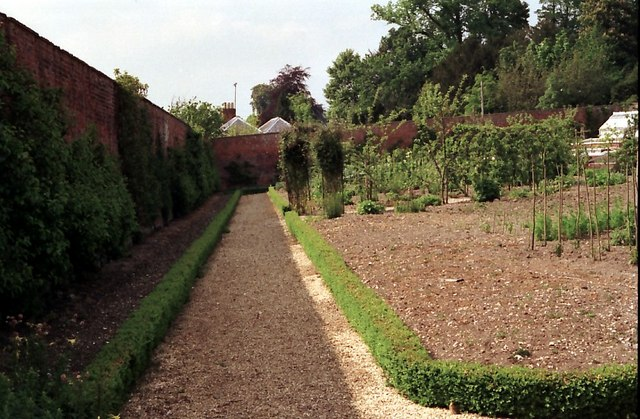
The south wall

== Episodes ==
Episode	Title	Airdate
1	The Beginning	16 September 1987
2	January	23 September 1987
3	February	30 September 1987
4	March	7 October 1987
5	April	14 October 1987
6	May	21 October 1987
7	June	28 October 1987
8	July	4 November 1987
9	August	11 November 1987
10	September	18 November 1987
11	October	25 November 1987
12	November	2 December 1987
13	December	9 December 1987

== Sequels and later availability ==
The series was successful and spawned three sequels, and a final standalone episode that was filmed in Canada:

- The Victorian Kitchen (with Ruth Mott), 1989
- The Victorian Flower Garden, 1991
- The Wartime Kitchen and Garden, 1993
- Harry's Big Adventure, 1994

Each of the series (except for The Wartime Kitchen and Garden) is commercially available on DVD, distributed by Acorn Media UK. Accompanying books of all four series were written by the associate producer, Jennifer Davies, and published by BBC Books.

- The Victorian Kitchen. London: B.B.C. Books, 1989 ISBN 0563206853
- The Victorian Kitchen Garden Companion; Harry Dodson and Jennifer Davies. London: B.B.C. Books, 1988 ISBN 0563207108
- The Victorian Kitchen Garden. London: B.B.C. Books, 1987 ISBN 0563204427

== Reception ==
Writing for The Guardian in 2009 during a repeat of the series, Lucy Mangan found that it was the "details that make the programme sing" and concluded by saying: "May it flourish somewhere in the schedules for ever."

Writer Helen Rosner discovered several episodes of the show online during the spring of 2020, and wrote a long article praising it for The New Yorker: "The Soothing Pleasures of "The Victorian Kitchen Garden", a Vintage BBC Docuseries".
