= Peter Thoday =

English horticulturalist

Peter Ralph Thoday
- with Harry Dodson in The Victorian Flower Garden (1991)
- Born: 30 October 1934
- Died: 5 May 2023 (aged 88)
- Spouse: Anne (née Thompson)
- Children: David, Helen
- Parents: Ralph Thoday (father); Mabel (née Ellis) (mother)

Peter Ralph Thoday (1934–2023) was a horticulturalist and television presenter. He was president of the Institute of Horticulture from 1994 to 1996. He was awarded the Veitch Memorial Medal by the Royal Horticultural Society in 2003 and the Victoria Medal of Honour in 2022.

His father was the head gardener of St John's College, Cambridge and so he studied horticulture as a student at the university's botanic garden. He continued in academia and became Senior Lecturer in Landscape Management at the University of Bath.

== Publications ==
- Two Blades of Grass, 2007, ISBN 9780955703300
- Cultivar, 2013, ISBN 9780955703317
- Plants and Planting on Landscape Sites, 2016, ISBN 9781780646190
