= James Craufurd (British Army officer) =

British Army general (1804–1888)

General James Craufurd
- Born: 1804
- Died: 1888 (aged 83–84)
- Military career
- Allegiance: United Kingdom
- Branch: British Army
- Rank: General
- Commands: Brigade of Guards
- Conflicts: Crimean War

General James Robertson Craufurd (1804–1888) was a senior British Army officer.

== Military career ==
Crauford was commissioned into the Grenadier Guards. He was commander of the Brigade of Guards during the Crimean War. He then became Major General commanding the Brigade of Guards in 1861. He was promoted to lieutenant general in 1863

In 1864, he became colonel of the 27th (Inniskilling) Regiment of Foot. Then, transferring to the 91st (Argyllshire Highlanders) Regiment of Foot in 1870.

His final promotion was to general in 1871; he retired in 1877.

== Family ==
Craufurd lived at Princes Gardens in London.

He married Elizabeth Georgiana Harriett Harcourt (nee Cavendish), the widow of Charles Harcourt and former sister-in-law of Georges, marquis d'Harcourt.

Military offices
Preceded by Lord Rokeby	Major-General commanding the Brigade of Guards; 1861–1863	Succeeded by Lord Frederick Paulet
Preceded by Charles Gordon James Arbuthnot	Colonel of the 91st (Princess Louise's Argyllshire Highlanders) Regiment of Foot; 1870–1881	Regiment amalgamated into Argyll and Sutherland Highlanders
Preceded by John Geddes	Colonel of the 27th (Inniskilling) Regiment of Foot; 1864–1870	Succeeded by Randal Rumley
