= Arthur Cunynghame =

British Army commander and memoirist

General Sir Arthur Cunynghame GCB FRGS
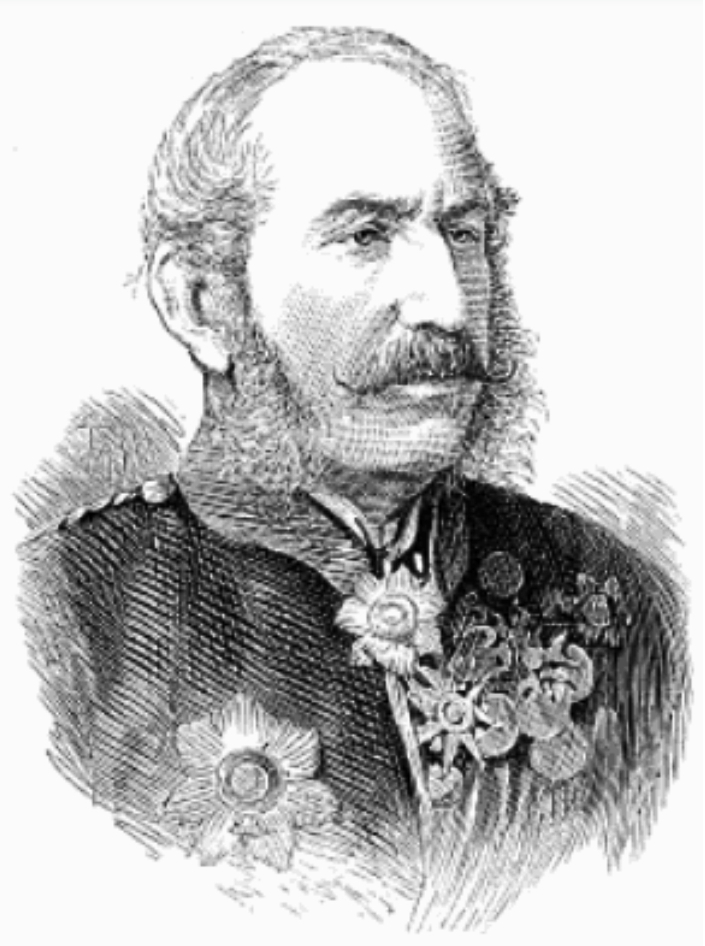
- Gen. Sir Arthur Cunynghame in The Illustrated London News, 1878
- Born: Arthur Augustus Thurlow Cunynghame; August 3, 1812; Malshanger, Hampshire, England
- Died: March 10, 1884 (aged 71) At sea
- Known for: British Army commander
- Spouse: Frances Elizabeth Hardinge
- Children: Lavinia Cunynghame; Emily Cunynghame; Mary Cunynghame; Henry Cunynghame; Arthur Cunynghame

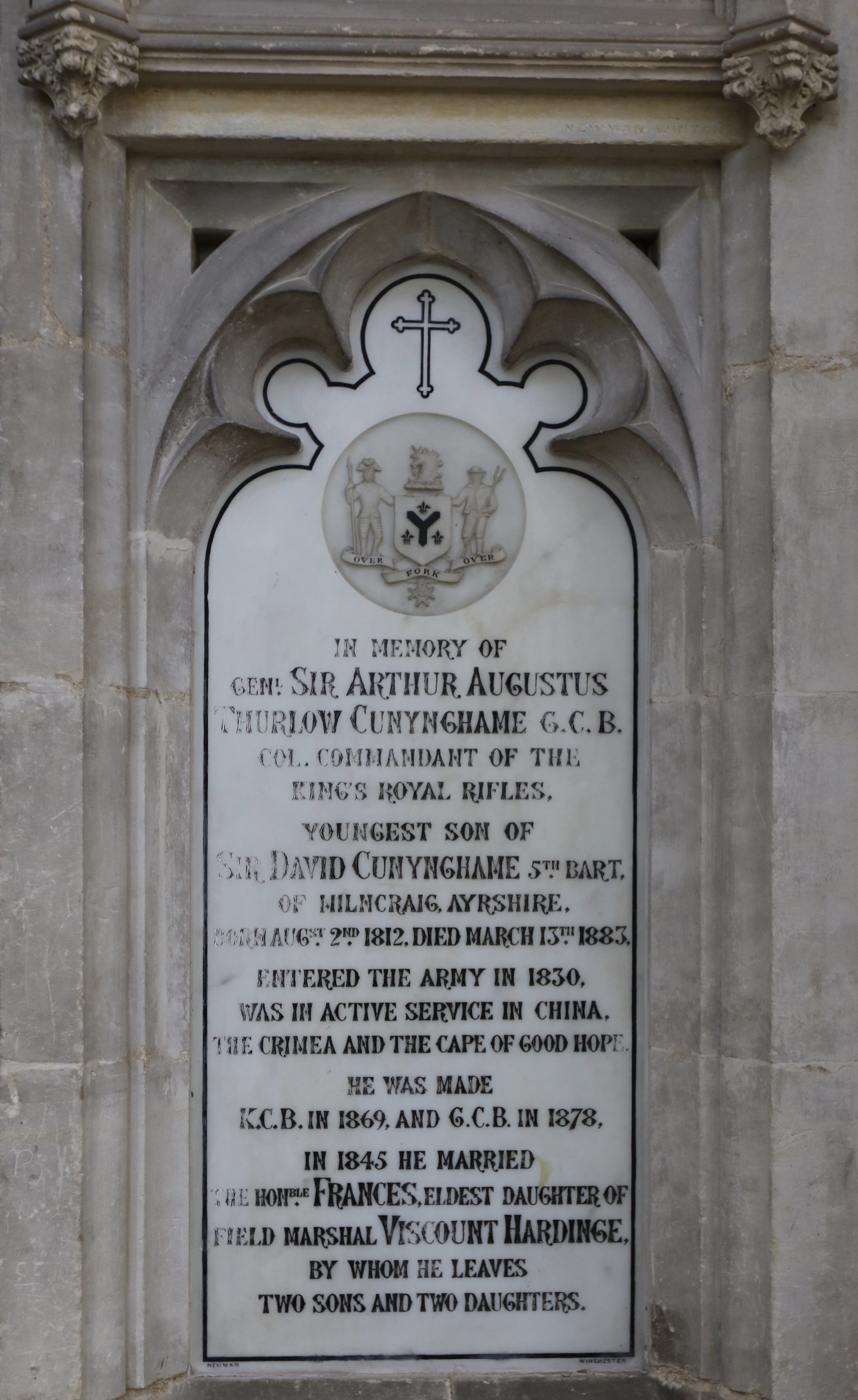
Memorial to Sir Arthur Augustus Thurlow Cunynghame in Winchester Cathedral

General Sir Arthur Augustus Thurlow Cunynghame GCB FRGS (3 August 1812 (Note: Cunynghame's birthdate is often misreported as 12 August; however, he was baptised in Oakley on 9 August 1812 and the news of his birth the previous Monday was published in the local newspaper on 10 August.) – 10 March 1884) was a British Army commander and memoirist. Cunynghame was colonel-commandant of the King's Royal Rifle Corps and of the 36th Regiment of Foot.

== Early life ==
Cunynghame was born at Malshanger House near Oakley, Hampshire, the fifth son of Col. Sir David Cunynghame, 5th Baronet of Milncraig, by his first wife, Mary (or Maria) Thurlow, an illegitimate daughter of Edward Thurlow, 1st Baron Thurlow.

== Career ==
Cunynghame joined the Army in November 1830 after purchasing a commission as a second lieutenant in the King's Royal Rifle Corps, 60th Rifles. He was promoted to lieutenant on 2 May 1835 and in 1841 was transferred to the 3rd Buffs. He served in the First Opium War as aide-de-camp to Major-General Alexander Fraser, Lord Saltoun, and he was present at the Battle of Chinkiang. He was mentioned in despatches and was present at the Treaty of Nanking. He served as aide-de-camp to Saltoun through January 1844.

In 1845, he was promoted to major and in November 1846 he was appointed lieutenant-colonel of the 13th Light Infantry. Within a month he transferred as lieutenant-colonel in the Grenadier Guards. He joined the 20th Regiment in 1849 and the 27th Regiment in 1852. In 1853–54, he served as aide-de-camp to his father-in-law, Commander-in-Chief of the Forces Viscount Hardinge, until returning to action in the Crimean War.

In 1854, Cunynghame served as assistant quartermaster-general to the first division, and was present at the affair of Bulganac and was present at the battles of the Alma, Balaclava, Inkerman, Chernaya, and at the Siege of Sebastopol. He was mentioned in despatches, received the Crimean medal with four clasps, the Turkish medal, was appointed a légionnaire of the Legion of Honour, the third class of the Order of the Medjidie, and was created a Companion of the Order of the Bath (CB).

Cunynghame was promoted to the brevet colonel in June 1854 and to local major-general in March 1855. Two months later he took command of a division of the Ottoman Army, receiving the personal thanks of Sultan Abdulmejid I, and was created a lieutenant-general in the Ottoman Army. That October, he commanded 10,000 men to occupy Kerch, maintaining the position throughout the winter in the Crimea. He was upgraded to officier of the Legion of Honour and the second class of the Order of the Medjidie.

He commanded an infantry brigade at Dublin from 1856 to 1860, and then left for India, commanding forces at Bombay to 1862. He was promoted to major-general in 1861. He commanded the troops in Bengal from May 1862 to 1865, when he returned to Dublin, where he was in command of the Dublin District. In December 1868, was appointed colonel of the 36th Regiment, succeeding the late Viscount Melville. In the 1869 Birthday Honours, he was created a knight commander of the Order of the Bath (KCB), and promoted to lieutenant-general in 1870.

From 1873 to 1878, he commanded the forces at the Cape of Good Hope, serving through the Xhosa Wars in 1877, when he was appointed Lieutenant-Governor of the Colony. In 1878, he was upgraded to Knight Grand Cross of the Order of the Bath (GCB). In February 1876, he left the 36th Regiment to become colonel commandant of the 60th Rifles, his former Corps. On 1 October 1877, he was promoted to general.

He was placed on the retired list in 1881.

== Personal life ==
In 1845, he married Frances Elizabeth Hardinge, daughter of Henry Hardinge, 1st Viscount Hardinge. They had three daughters and two sons:

- Lavinia Augusta Charlotte Cunynghame (d. 31 Mar 1922) married Capt. George Williams-Freeman, son of Frederick Peere Williams-Freeman (grandson of Adm. William Peere Williams-Freeman and Augusta Napier (daughter of Capt. Henry Edward Napier). They had three sons, and two daughters.
- Emily Caroline Thurlow Cunynghame married Charles Walter Oddie. no known issue.
- Mary Sarah Hardinge Cunynghame. Unmarried.
- Sir Henry Hardinge Samuel Cunynghame KCB (8 July 1848 - 3 May 1935) married Emily Harriette Prescott, daughter of Col. Arthur Prescott, on 21 June 1893. No issue.
- Arthur Hardinge David Cunynghame (17 Nov 1853 - 14 Nov 1917) married Alexandra Isabel Scott, daughter of Alexander Scott. They had two sons and a daughter.

He died at sea returning home from India while traveling for pleasure with his eldest daughter.

== Bibliography ==
- The Opium War: being Recollections of Service in China. London: G.B. Zieber & Co. 1845.
- A Glimpse at the Great Western Republic. London: Richard Bentley. 1851.
- Travels in the Eastern Caucasus, on the Caspian and Black Seas. London: John Murray. 1872.
- My Command in South Africa, 1874–1878. London: Macmillan and Co. 1880.

== Notes ==
Military offices
Preceded by Edward Basil Brooke	Colonel of the 36th Regiment of Foot; 1868–1876	Succeeded by Sir Charles Staveley
Preceded by Viscount Melville	Colonel of the 60th Regiment of Foot; 1876–1884	Succeeded by Randal Rumley
