= John Pearse =

British guitarist and folk singer (1939–2008)

- Instrument: Guitar

John Pearse (12 September 1939 – 31 October 2008) was a British guitarist, folk singer and music educator, who came to prominence in the 1960s presenting the popular BBC2 television guitar tuition series, Hold Down a Chord.

== Life and career ==
He was born in Hook in Yorkshire, but grew up in Prestatyn in north Wales where his father ran a hotel. In his teens he played the guitar and banjo in a Jazz band, then moved to London in the 1950s where he made a living as a guitar teacher and musician. He learnt to play Piedmont style guitar (a form of fingerstyle) after hearing Big Bill Broonzy, who toured Europe in 1957. Pearse went on to write his first guitar tutor, "Teach Yourself Folk Guitar" (comprising an album and instructional booklet) at the age of 19.

While playing in the clubs he was spotted by a BBC television producer who invited him to write and present a guitar tuition series for the newly created BBC TV channel BBC2. This became "Hold Down a Chord", a ten-part course for beginners, first broadcast in 1967, with accompanying instructional book and LP. It was shown in many countries and taught viewers the rudiments of fingerstyle guitar as played by guitarists such as Mississippi John Hurt, Big Bill Broonzy and Reverend Gary Davis. This was a timely series, because of the ongoing British folk revival and the popularity of singer-songwriters and guitarists like Bob Dylan. Amongst the many inspired by Pearse was a young Martin Carthy who went on to become a major figure in the UK Folk scene. Stuart Adamson (Skids and Big Country) watched ‘Hold Down a Chord’ when he was learning guitar and was quoted as saying “I owe it all to him”

During the 1960s and 1970s, Pearse was much in demand as a studio session musician and record producer for several companies. He continued to write tuition books for the guitar and other stringed instruments. He became well known in Germany, headlining folk festivals and described by the weekly magazine Stern as "the nation's guitar teacher". In 1978 he moved to the US, where he designed products for the Martin Guitar Company. After leaving Martin he founded Breezy Ridge Instruments, along with Mary Faith Rhoads, to market his line of guitar strings and other guitar accessories.

In 1983, a medical error during a myelogram procedure left him paralysed from the neck down and threatened to finish his career. Astonishingly, after years of intensive physical therapy, he was able to walk again and relearnt how to play the guitar. In 1986 he presented the series Cooking with Wine for American television (the accompanying book became a best-seller) and in 1987 another guitar tuition series, "String Along".

In 2002 he settled with his family in Besigheim, Germany, drawn there by the surrounding wine-growing region. He lived there until his death in 2008 following some years of ill-health. He was survived by his wife Linda, his adopted son, and his former wife and longtime business partner Mary Faith Rhoads.

His track "Basic Plucking of the Ballad Lick" is used as a sample in Lemon Jelly's song "The Staunton Lick" from the album Lemonjelly.ky.

== Bibliography ==
- Teach yourself Appalachian dulcimer (English Folk Dance & Song Society, 1966)
- Hold Down A Chord: A Guitar course for beginners (BBC Pubs., 1968)
- The John Pearse Balalaika method (Francis, Day & Hunter, 1967)
- Hold Down a Chord Book 2: Finger Picking Folk Guitar Styles (BBC Publications, 1969)
- Saturday Night: Twenty Tabulated Folk Songs for the Guitar (BBC Publications, 1969)
- The John Pearse single string melody method for folk guitarists (Feldman, 1969)
- 1st Guide To Guitar – a Simple Course Providing the Basics (Amsco Music Pub., 1970)
- The John Pearse Album of Ragtime Guitar Solos (B. Feldman and Co. Ltd., 1970)
- The Dulcimer Book (London: ATV-Kirshner Music, 1970)
- Ragtime and Counterpoint Guitar Method (1972)
- The John Pearse Blues Guitar Method (Scratchwood Music, 1972)
- The Guitarist's Picture Chord Encyclopedia (Music Sales Ltd, 1977)
- Frets and Fingers: A Guitar Player's Manual (Paddington Press Ltd, 1978)
- The Penguin Folk Guitar Manual (Penguin Books, 1979)
- String Along: Learn Guitar with John Pearse (John Pearse Music, 1986)
- Cooking With Wine (Buckingham Wine Press, 1987)

== Discography ==
- Rap-A-Tap-Tap (English Folk Songs Miss Pringle Never Taught Us) (Folklore, 1960) — with Frank Purslow
- Bottoms Up! (English Soak Songs for Fools) (Folklore, 1961) (EP) — with Frank Purslow
- Teach Yourself Folk Guitar (Saga, 1963) (LP and instructional booklet)
- John Pearse, (Xtra, 1965)
- Folk 66 (ARC, 1966) – with Colin Wilkie and Shirley Hart
- Hold down a Chord: Folk Guitar for Beginners (BBC Records, 1967) (LP)
- Guitar Train (Metronome, 1968) (German re-release of John Pearse from 1965)
- Blues, Rags & Raga (DaCamera, 1972)
- Travelling Man (Songbird, 1975)
- Alive and Well...and Living in America (Underdog Records, 1980)
- Together (Underdog Records, 1980) – with Mary Faith Rhoads
- Live! At Kutztown (Shubb, 2002)
- The Lost 1966 Waldeck Audition (Bear Family, 2010)

Pearse also featured on the following compilations:

- Makaber macht lustig (Xenophon, 1967) (“Down in the Valley”, “As I Went out one Morning”)
- Chanson & Folk Supersession, Volume 1 (Intercord Xenophon, 1975) (“Cocaine”)
- Chanson & Folk Supersession, Volume 2 (Intercord Xenophon, 1975) (“Down in the Valley”)
- Burg Waldeck Festival 1967 – Chanson, Folklore International (Studio Wedemark, 2004) (“Cocaine”)
- Die Burg Waldeck Festivals 1964–1969 (Bear Family, 2008) (“The Shoemaker's Kiss” with Shirley Hart, “The Bonnie Lass O'Fyvie” with Colin Wilkie, “It's of a Little Taylor”, “As I Went out one Morning”, “Cocaine”, “McGee's Jig”, “Oh Baby, It Ain't no Lie”, )
- Contemporary Folk Guitar (CAMBRA records, 1982) ("McGee's Rag", "Guitar Train")
