= Kennet and Lambourn Floodplain =

Biological Site of Special Scientific Interest in Wiltshire, England

- Site of Special Scientific Interest
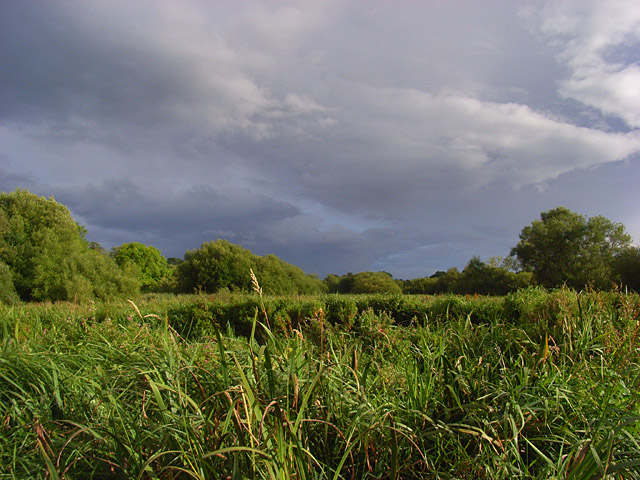
- Rack Marsh

- Location within Berkshire
- Location of Kennet and Lambourn Floodplain.
- Area of search: Berkshire; Wiltshire
- Grid reference: SU 370 691
- Coordinates: 51.420°N 1.469°W
- Interest: Biological
- Area: 23.4 hectares (58 acres)
- Notification date: 1996
- Location map: Magic Map

Kennet and Lambourn Floodplain is a 23.4-hectare (58-acre) biological Site of Special Scientific Interest in six widely separated areas in the floodplains of the River Lambourn in Berkshire and the River Kennet in Wiltshire, England. It is a Nature Conservation Review site and part of the Kennet and Lambourn Floodplain Special Area of Conservation. One of the areas, Rack Marsh, is managed by the Berkshire, Buckinghamshire and Oxfordshire Wildlife Trust.

These six areas all have fen or swamp with large numbers of Desmoulin's whorl snail, which is listed in the British Red Data Book as it is a nationally rare and declining species. One of the areas, Eddington Marsh, also has unimproved species-rich grassland with several nationally scarce invertebrates, such as the flies Pherbellia griseola, Psacadina verbekei, Platypalpus niger and Oxycera morrisi.

== Locations ==
- SU316705 51.4321°N 1.5454°W
- SU402737 51.4604°N 1.4213°W
- SU345687 51.4158°N 1.5038°W
- SU435701 51.4278°N 1.3743°W
- SU453692 51.4195°N 1.3485°W
- SU450674 51.4034°N 1.3530°W
- Location SU556655 51.3853°N 1.2009°W is shown as a seventh area in the citation, but the citation also says that there are only six areas in the site and it is not shown on the Natural England map.
