= Winterbourne, Berkshire =

Coordinates: 51°26′42″N 1°20′46″W

Winterbourne
- Village and civil parish
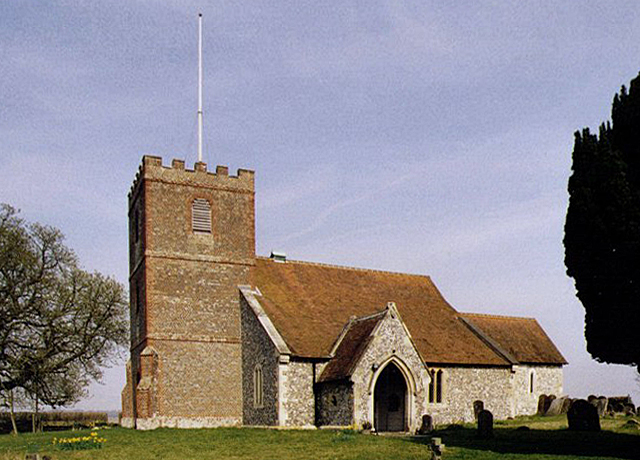
- St James' parish church

- Location within Berkshire
- Population: 189 (2011 census)
- OS grid reference: SU4572
- Civil parish: Winterbourne
- Unitary authority: West Berkshire
- Ceremonial county: Berkshire
- Region: South East
- Country: England
- Sovereign state: United Kingdom
- Post town: Newbury
- Postcode district: RG20
- Dialling code: 01635
- Police: Thames Valley
- Fire: Royal Berkshire
- Ambulance: South Central
- UK Parliament: Newbury

Winterbourne is a village and civil parish in the Berkshire Downs about 3 miles (5 km) north of Newbury in West Berkshire.

== Etymology ==
Winterbourne takes its name from a stream which flows in winter and sometimes in a wet summer. Bourne means a stream that does not flow all year round.

== History ==
Borough Hill nearby was settled by Early Saxons in the Iron Age. Romans camped on Bussock Hill, and left a double vallum and ditch around their camp. The Vicinal Way, which was a branch of the old Roman way Ermyn Street, ran through Winterbourne past the camp.

Winterbourne was mentioned in 951 when the bounds of Chieveley were defined at the time when King Edmund's brother Edred gave it to Wulf or Wulfric, his bailiff.

In 1156, Nicholas, son of Turold os Estuna gave land for a churchyard in Winterbourne.

In August 1552 during the plundering of churches under Edward VI, records show that "one cope of satin of Bruge and one frontlet for the hie Altar of braunched damask" were stolen.

In the early 20th century, there remained a historic tradition of a Rogation Day procession for the blessing of the fields.

== Ghosts ==
Winterbourne shares with Chieveley the ghost of the daughter of Philip Weston. She is purported to have run away in dismay on hearing three blasts of a trumpet, which told her that her lover and her father had been killed at the battle of Newbury. She fell down the well and was drowned.

Another ghost is that of Philip Henshaw who gave the bell to Winterbourne Church. His horse ran away with him down Bussock Hill and he broke his neck. It is said that you can hear the clatter of his horse's hooves going down the hill.

== Geography ==
Winterbourne has a site of Special Scientific Interest (SSSI), called Winterbourne Chalk Pit and another on its western border called Snelsmore Common

== Parish church ==
The Church of England parish church of Saint James was completely redeveloped in the 18th and 19th centuries. The north chapel was added in 1712 and the bell tower in 1759. The architect J.W. Hugall rebuilt the nave in 1854 and a Mr. Hudson restored the chancel in 1895. Hudson retained the chancel's 14th-century east window, and an earlier lancet window in the south wall. The building is Grade II* listed.

== Civil War ==
Winterbourne and the surrounding area had an eventful Civil War. Donnington Castle was damaged by cannon; the First and Second Battles of Newbury were fought nearby. King Charles stayed the night at Winterbourne Manor before the Second Battle of Newbury. On 26 October 1644, Cromwell stopped at the Blue Boar Inn, which is in the north of the parish, for a mug of beer, and his forces camped at North Heath. In July that year, his forces had taken on Prince Rupert and company at Ripley in Yorkshire, during which a successful (for the Parliamentarians) skirmish, they stole a statue of a wild boar that Lord Ingleby had brought back from Italy as one of a pair. The other remains in Ripley Castle. The blue boar was left at the pub, now The Crab Hotel.

== Transport ==
Bus travel from Newbury is provided by Newbury and District service 5A, twice daily on weekdays.

== Sources ==
- Pevsner, Nikolaus (1966). Berkshire. The Buildings of England. Harmondsworth: Penguin Books. p. 307.
