= Leverton, Berkshire =

Hamlet in Berkshire, England

Coordinates: 51.428°N 1.522°W

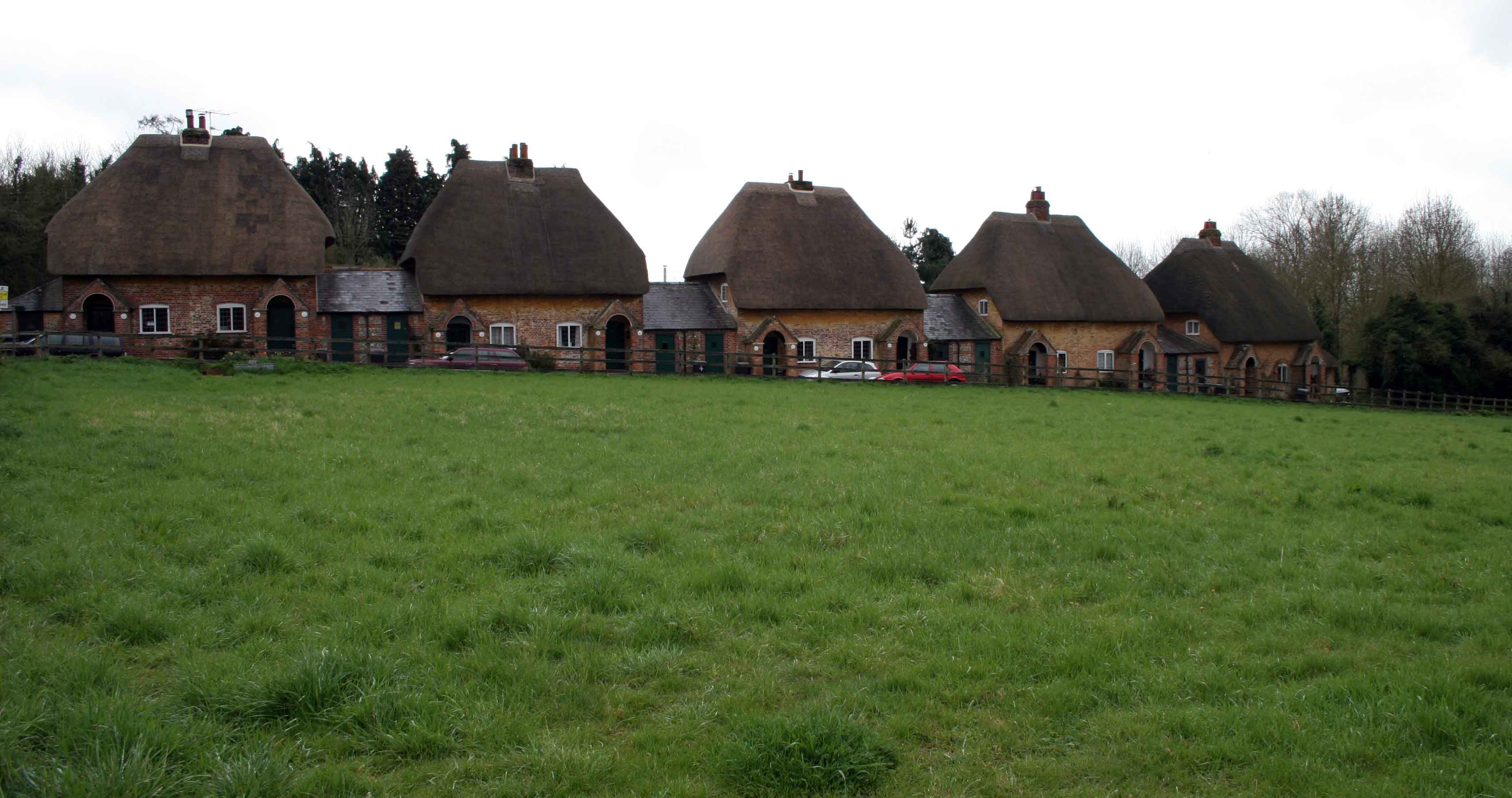
Pepperpot Cottages at Leverton Hamlet

Leverton is a small hamlet in West Berkshire, England, close to the border with Wiltshire and around 2 mi (3 km) north-west of Hungerford.

== History ==
Leverton appears in the Domesday Book of 1086 as lands owned by the Abingdon Abbey, with 9 households, and valued at 2 shillings and ten pence. Its name was likely inspired by the woman's name Leofwaru's Farm, and it would go on to become the estate village of Chilton Lodge estate. By the Middle Ages there were approximately 13 farmsteads associated with the village. These were demolished over the course of the 19th century.

Leverton was a hamlet under the civil parish of Chilton Foliat, an unusual parish as it was split across Wiltshire and Berkshire. Leverton, however, was situated completely on the Berkshire side of the parish, and would be transferred to Hungerford parish in 1895.

A set of six thatched cottages, known as Leverton Cottages, were built some time after 1767, and over the following hundred years a further four were built in the same style to match.

The village is a complete survival of an 18th/19th century estate village and comprises a model farm, Gardener's bothy, Head Gardener's cottage, kitchen garden with a full set of boiler houses and potting sheds, thatched apple store and as well as the Leverton Cottages originally inhabited by estate workers. The kitchen garden was restored to production in the late 1980s by the BBC for the Victorian Kitchen Garden series and also featured in subsequent spin-offs such as The Victorian Kitchen and The Victorian Flower Garden. The hamlet also retains a set of stocks, although the originals were removed to the Ashmolean Museum, Oxford in the 1990s and were replaced by a (non-functioning) replica.
