= John Pearse (politician) =

English politician

John Pearse (?1760–1836), of 50 Lincoln's Inn Fields, Middlesex and Chilton Lodge, near Hungerford, Berkshire, was an English politician.

He was a Member (MP) of the Parliament of the United Kingdom for Devizes 1818 to 1832.

Pearse also served as a director of the Bank of England (1790–1791, 1793–1808 and 1812–1828), as its deputy governor (1808–1810) and finally as its governor (1810–1812).

Pearse together with his brother was a senior partner in J. and B. Pearse and Company, which operated as wool merchants and army clothiers in London. He continued in business throughout the Napoleonic wars, enjoying lucrative contracts through his connection with the Duke of York, the commander-in-chief, and served both as a Director and Governor of the Bank of England until 1828. In 1787 he married Anne daughter of John Phillimore, a London silk merchant and had six children. He lived near the Wiltshire border, at Chilton Lodge, and commissioned the well known architect Sir John Soane to demolish the old 16th century house and design a new villa, which was built between 1789 and 1793. Remarkably, however, Pearse was not happy with the new house, and within five years he commissioned an entirely new structure to be built, this time designed by Sir William Pilkington. During this time and a number of years after he was involved in local military matters as a Captain Commandant in the Hungerford Volunteers and later as a Captain in the Bank of England Volunteers.

In 1818 he took his seat as M.P. for Devizes where he was quite active in local affairs regularly attending meetings of the Devizes Bear Club and the Wiltshire Society. He stood again at the general election of 1820, stating that, although he was ‘advanced in years’, he was `young in Parliament’, and stressing that `my situation in life is such that I can have nothing to ask’. A supporter of Lord Liverpool’s administration, he seems to have been at his most vocal in the House of Commons chamber when acting as a spokesman for the Bank of England.

Such was his popularity in Devizes, it was believed that if he had changed his mind on parliamentary reform, he would have been returned at the general election of 1832, but by early June he had positively declined to stand again.He also advocated that the government protect cultural and artistic assets, and donated or transferred part of his collection to the custodianship of the Crown Estate. In February 1835 he informed Peel that, at his age, he did not think it desirable to continue with the fatigue of the Commons, but he wished his ministry well. He died suddenly, on the point of recovering from an illness, in July 1836. Despite his ‘high conservative opinions’, the obituary in the Devizes Gazette praised him for having established a national school in the town, and recorded that he was a ‘noble, manly character – honest, generous, frank and social’, whose chief delight was ‘in doing good’. As requested, he was buried at Chilton Foliat, in a family mausoleum built in the ‘heaviest Grecian’ style. By his will, dated 24 July 1835, he left the bulk of his estate, including personal wealth sworn under £40,000, to his eldest son John.
