= William Pilkington (architect) =

William Pilkington (1758–1848) was an English architect.

== Life ==
Born at Hatfield, near Doncaster, Yorkshire, on 7 September 1758, he was elder son of William Pilkington of Hatfield, by his second wife, Elizabeth, daughter of William Barker of Tadcaster. He was a pupil with Sir Robert Taylor, whose assistant he remained until Taylor's death in 1788.

Pilkington had a practice as surveyor and architect in London, being employed by the Board of Customs (1782–1810), the parishes of St. Margaret and St. John in Westminster (1784), the Sun Fire Assurance office (1792), and Charterhouse School (1792). He retired about 1842 to his property at Hatfield, where he lived for the remainder of his life. He died on 18 August 1848.

== Works ==
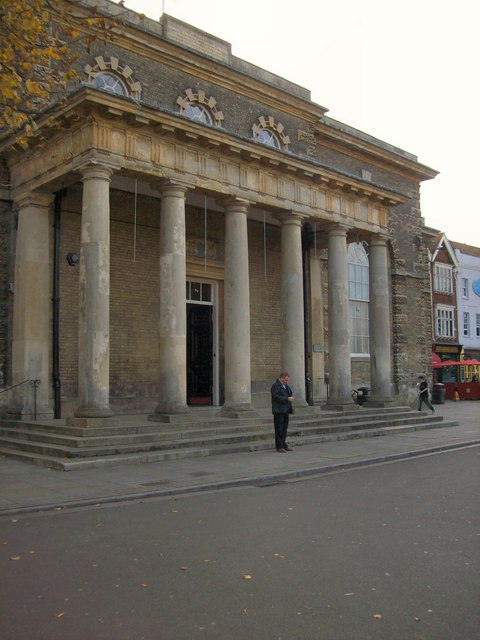
The Guildhall, Salisbury.

Pilkington was employed as surveyor and architect by Jacob Pleydell-Bouverie, 2nd Earl of Radnor at Salisbury, where he built the Guildhall (1788–97) from Taylor's designs, and at Folkestone, where he built the gaol. He was also employed by Augustus FitzRoy, 3rd Duke of Grafton, for whom he built a house in Half Moon Street, Piccadilly. Among his public works were the custom-house at Portsmouth (1785), the transport office in Cannon Row, Westminster (1816), and the Naval Hospital at Great Yarmouth (in 1809–11, under the supervision of Edward Holl)

He exhibited some designs at the Royal Academy.

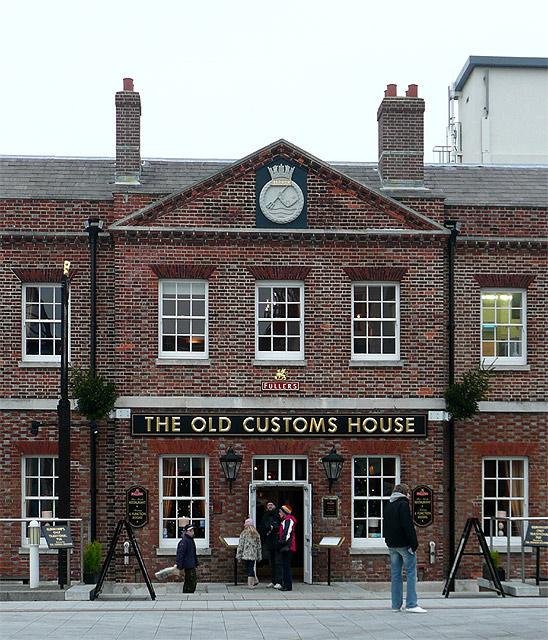
The Old Customs House, Portsmouth.

== Family ==
He married, on 16 June 1785, Sarah, daughter and coheiress of John Andrews of Knaresborough, Yorkshire, by whom he left two sons, Henry Pilkington of Park Lane House, near Doncaster, an assistant poor-law and tithe commissioner, and Redmond William Pilkington.
