= Snelsmore Common =

Nature reserve near Newbury, Berkshire

- Site of Special Scientific Interest
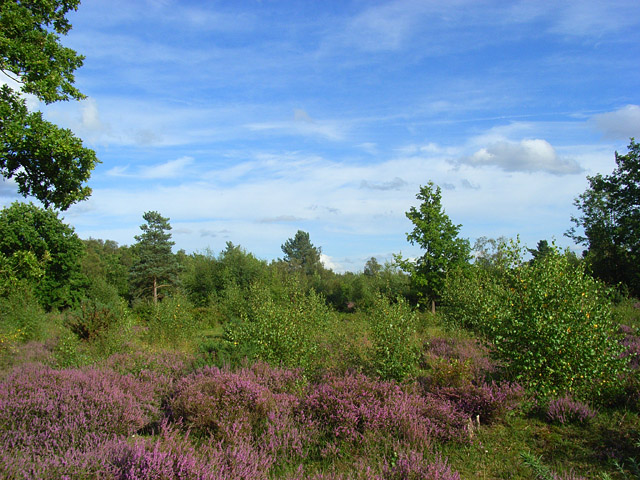

- Location within Berkshire
- Location of Snelsmore Common.
- Area of search: Berkshire
- Grid reference: SU 460 710
- Coordinates: 51.436°N 1.340°W
- Interest: Biological
- Area: 104.0 hectares (257 acres)
- Notification date: 1989
- Location map: Magic Map

Snelsmore Common is a 104-hectare (260-acre) biological Site of Special Scientific Interest north of Newbury in Berkshire. It is owned by West Berkshire Council and managed by the Berkshire, Buckinghamshire and Oxfordshire Wildlife Trust.

This is a country park which has diverse habitats, including dry heath, wet heath, bog, birch woods and ancient semi-natural broadleaved woodland. The bog has a 5,000 year old layer of peat which has been studied stratigraphically to show changes in ancient land use and vegetation. An area of wet alder woodland has many lichens, including a rich community which grows on trees, such as Parmelia caperarta, Pertusaria pertusa and Lecanactis abietina.
