= Harry Dodson =

English gardener (1919-2005)

Harry James Dodson
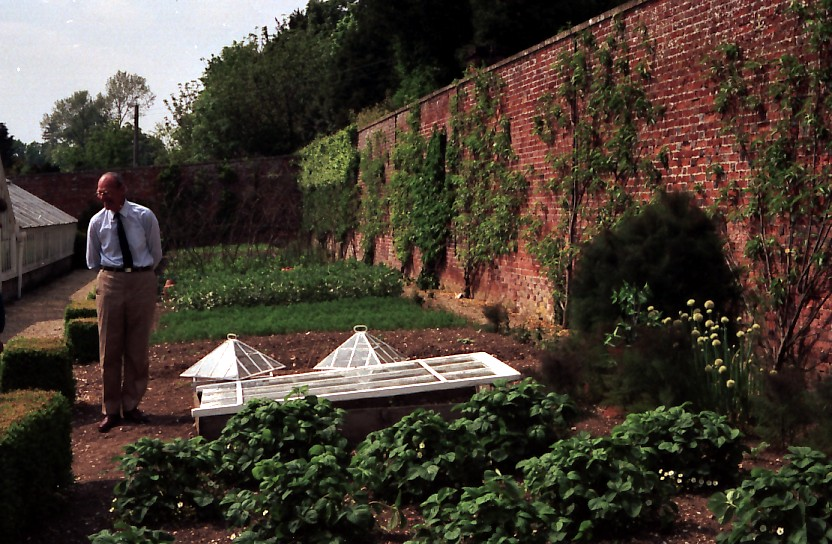
- Harry Dodson at the south facing wall of The Victorian Kitchen Garden, 1989
- Born: 11 September 1919; Byfleet, Surrey, England
- Died: 25 July 2005 (aged 85); Chilton Foliat, Wiltshire, England
- Resting place: St Matthew's Church, Blackmoor, Hampshire, England
- Spouse: Jane Dodson

Harry James Dodson (11 September 1919 – 25 July 2005) was an English gardener who became a celebrity as a result of the BBC television documentary series The Victorian Kitchen Garden, which featured his professional expertise and his reminiscences.

== Early life ==
Horticulture was in Dodson's family. Born in Byfleet, his father was a gardener and his uncle was head gardener to the Earl of Selborne.

He left school at 14, and over the next six years worked his way up from garden boy to journeyman.

In 1937 he started work at Stansted Park as a 'young improver journeyman' in the kitchen garden.

When the Second World War started he served briefly in France, but was discharged on medical grounds. He was appointed general garden foreman at Leigh Park in Hampshire. The large house had been commandeered by the Admiralty and Dodson's task was to grow enough food for several hundred people every day.

After the war he moved to Nuneham Park, near Oxford, where he met his future wife, Jane.

In 1947 he was appointed head gardener at the Chilton Estate, near Chilton Foliat, growing flowers and vegetables for the household in an extensive walled garden, with heated greenhouses and 200 yards of cloches. By 1981, the cost of maintaining the garden had become too high for its owner. He made it over to Dodson, who ran it as a commercial nursery.

He was a successful exhibitor at the Royal Horticultural Society's shows, and in 1956 he joined the fruit and vegetable committee and served as a judge at its shows for nearly 50 years.

== Television fame ==
In 1984, Jennifer Davies of the BBC was looking for a venue for a projected television programme on traditional methods of vegetable gardening, to be called The Victorian Kitchen Garden. She discovered the walled garden at Chilton Foliat, and its head gardener, Harry Dodson. He did not claim to be a Victorian gardener himself, but he had learned his trade from men who had been, and he understood the techniques they had developed.

The series was screened in 1987, when he was 68, and its popularity spawned three other BBC series — The Victorian Kitchen, The Victorian Flower Garden and The Wartime Kitchen and Garden. The accompanying books were best-sellers.

Dodson became a popular personality and in 1992 wrote his own book about growing vegetables, Harry Dodson's Practical Kitchen Garden.

He died at Chilton Foliat on 25 July 2005, aged 85. His ashes were interred alongside his mother's remains at St Matthew's Church, Blackmoor, on 19 June 2017.

== Publications ==
- The Victorian Kitchen Garden Companion (BBC Books, UK, 1988) ISBN 978-0-563-20710-8
- Harry Dodson's Practical Kitchen Garden (BBC Books, UK, 1992) ISBN 978-0-563-36357-6
