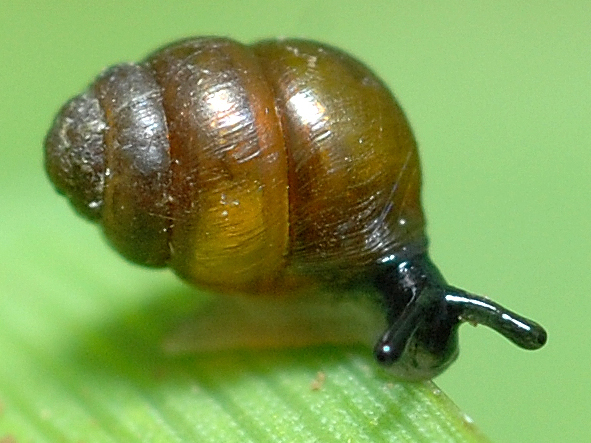

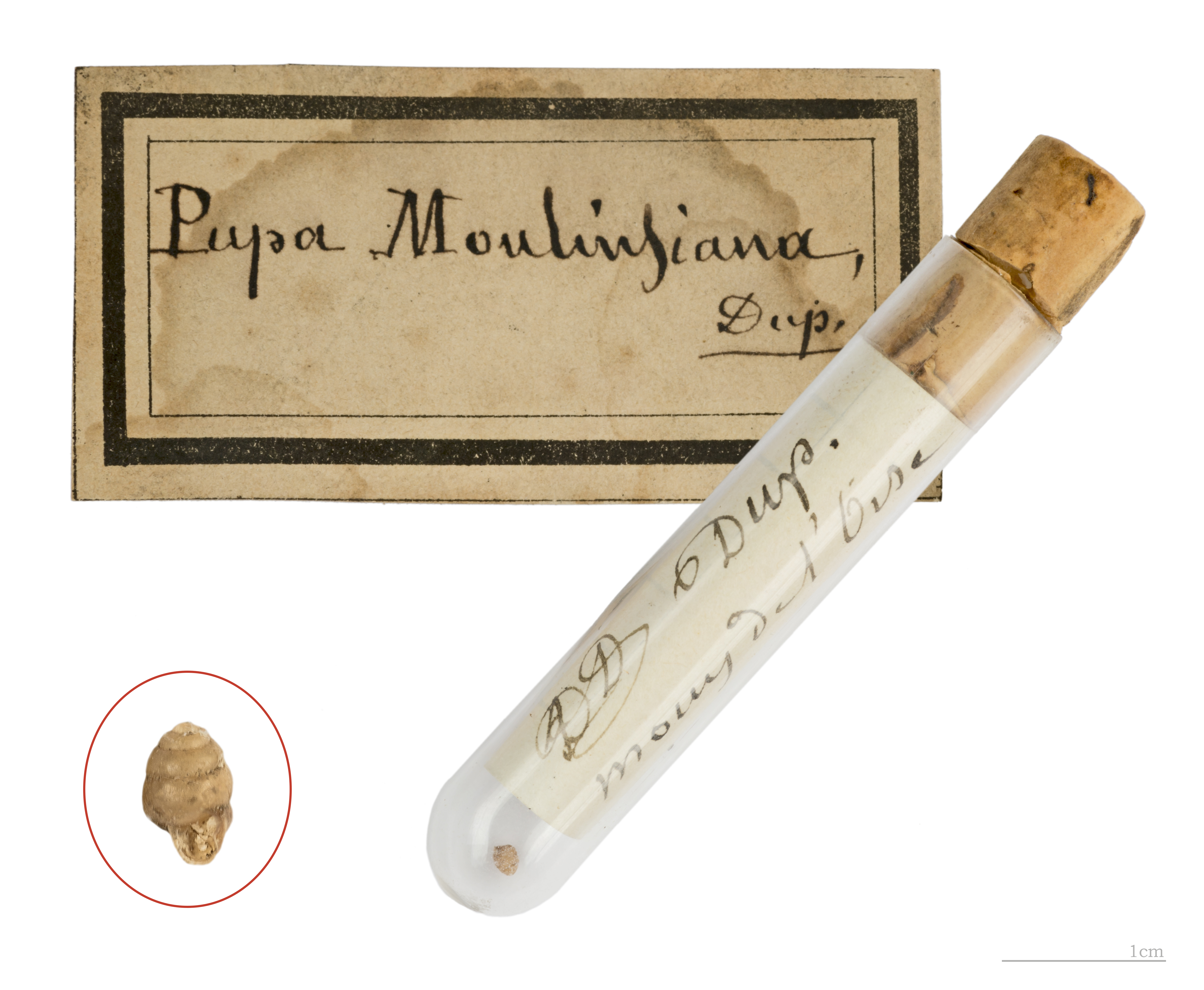
- Vertigo moulinsiana Holotype MHNT

Conservation status
- Vulnerable (IUCN 3.1)

Scientific classification
- Kingdom: Animalia
- Phylum: Mollusca
- Class: Gastropoda
- Order: Stylommatophora
- Family: Vertiginidae
- Genus: Vertigo
- Species: V. moulinsiana

Binomial name
- Vertigo moulinsiana (Dupuy, 1849)

Synonyms
- Pupa moulinsiana Dupuy, 1849; Pupa laevigata Kokeil, in Gallenstein, 1852; Pupa charpentieri Shuttleworth, in Küster, 1852; Pupa moulinsiana var. personata Moquin-Tandon, 1855; Vertigo ventrosa Heynemann, 1862; Pupa küsteriana Westerlund, 1875; Pupa mulinsania var. octodentata Westerlund, 1878; Vertigo limbata Moquin-Tandon, 1855; Pupa desmoulinsi Germain, 1913

= Desmoulin's whorl snail =

Species of gastropod

Desmoulin's whorl snail (Vertigo moulinsiana) is a species of small air-breathing land snail, a terrestrial pulmonate gastropod mollusc or micromollusc in the family Vertiginidae, the whorl snails.

This species was named in honor of the early-19th-century French naturalist Charles des Moulins.

== Habitat ==
Desmoulin's whorl snail inhabits calcareous wetlands, where there are tall sedges, saw-sedge (Cladium mariscus), reed-grass (Glyceria maxima) or the reed Phragmites australis.

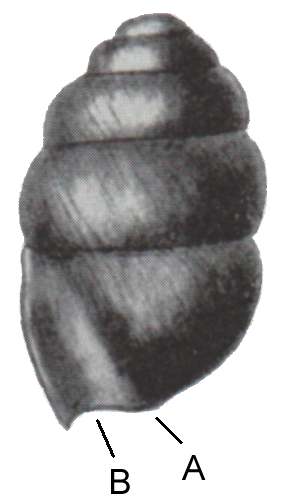
lateral view of the shell of Vertigo moulinsiana

== Distribution ==
The distribution of this species is Atlantic (the part of the Palearctic area which is under the direct climatic influence of the Atlantic Ocean), and southern-European.

This small snail occurs across Europe as far north as southern Sweden.

Within Western Europe, only the populations in England (Great Britain) and Ireland are considered to be viable, although further populations exist in the Czech Republic (critically endangered, occupying the White Carpathians Biosphere Reserve, Kokořínsko Landscape Protected Area and Southern Moravia), in Poland (critically endangered) and elsewhere in Europe (for example: Netherlands, France). Its conservation status in the Czech Republic in 2004–2006 was described as favourable (FV) in the report for the European Commission in accordance with the Habitats Directive. Its conservation status in Spain is endangered and it occurs in two localities only: near Estañá lake and near Lake of Banyoles.

It is also found in Belgium, Switzerland, Italy, Germany, Austria, Slovakia, Hungary, Romania, Denmark, Norway, Finland, Latvia, Lithuania, Estonia, Belarus, Ukraine (Volhynia, critically endangered; around 2014 extinct in Crimea), Russia, Georgia and Azerbaijan. Its distribution also include Algeria and Morocco, but it is possibly extinct in Algeria.

This species is mentioned in Annex II of the European Union's Habitats Directive.

=== Status in the United Kingdom ===
In the United Kingdom, Desmoulin's whorl snail is listed as endangered, although it occurs in a number of areas in a band from Norfolk to Dorset, with outlying populations in Kent and the Llŷn Peninsula in North Wales and has probably been under-reported in the past because of its minute size. Its presence on the site of the planned Newbury bypass caused the building of that road to be postponed; the building works were able to go ahead once the snails had been moved to a new habitat nearby. It is reported to have since died out at the new site, but the same report states "Desmoulin's whorl snail is now considered less scarce than it was 10 years ago".

== Shell description ==
The shell is dextral, minute, ovate, ventricose, obtuse at the apex, smoothish, subperforate. The aperture is semiovate, four-toothed, with one tooth on the parietal wall, another on the columella, and two palatals, the lower one longer. The shell has four whorls, parted by a distinct suture, the last doubly larger than all the others together. It is rather solid, glossy, subpellucid and of a uniform fulvous color.

The shell of this species reaches about 3 mm in length. The shell is yellowish or brownish and translucent.

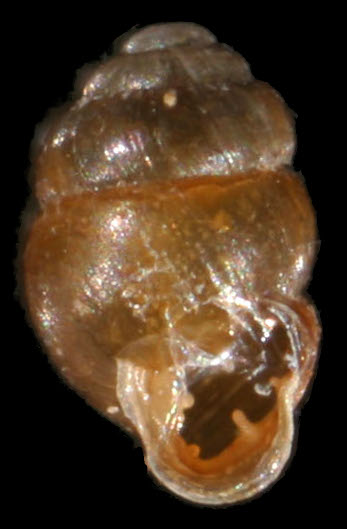
Photo of the shell.

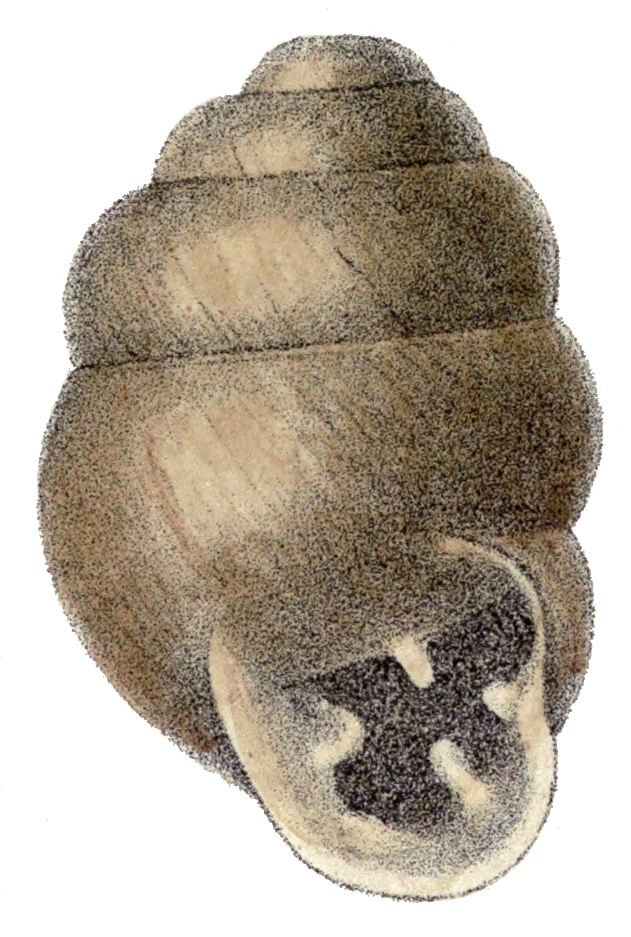
Drawing of the shell.

== On a stamp ==
Deutsche Post featured V. moulinsiana on a 2002 German €0.51 postage stamp as part of a series on endangered species of animals.
