= Stockcross and Bagnor Halt railway station =

Former railway station in England

Stockcross and Bagnor Halt
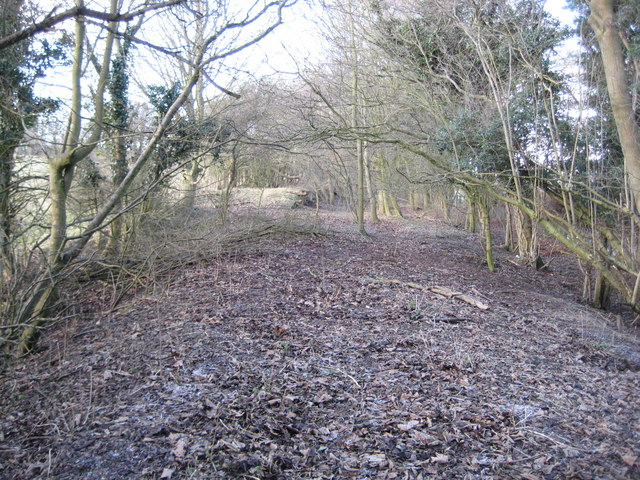
- Station site in 2010.

General information
- Location: Woodspeen, Berkshire; England
- Coordinates: 51.4195°N 1.3653°W
- Grid reference: SU441691
- Platforms: 1

Other information
- Status: Disused

History
- Original company: Lambourn Valley Railway
- Pre-grouping: Great Western Railway
- Post-grouping: Great Western Railway

Key dates
- 1898: Opened as Stockcross
- ?: Renamed Stockcross and Bagnor
- 1934: Renamed Stockcross and Bagnor Halt
- 1960: Closed
Location

Stockcross and Bagnor Halt railway station was a railway station near Newbury, Berkshire, England on the Lambourn Valley Railway. It served the villages of Stockcross and Bagnor.

== History ==
The station opened on 4 April 1898. Originally named Stockcross, it soon became Stockcross and Bagnor.

=== Passenger traffic ===
It was staffed until 1905, after which station staff would be drafted in from nearby Boxford railway station as necessary. On 9 July 1934, the station was down-classified to a "halt".

=== Goods traffic ===
The station often dealt with light goods, including dairy produce. It was used to transport racehorses to and from the nearby Marsh Benham stud.

=== Closure ===
The station closed on 4 January 1960.

Preceding station	Disused railways	Following station
Speen	Great Western Railway; Lambourn Valley Railway	Boxford
