= Stockcross =

Coordinates: 51.4125°N 1.375°W

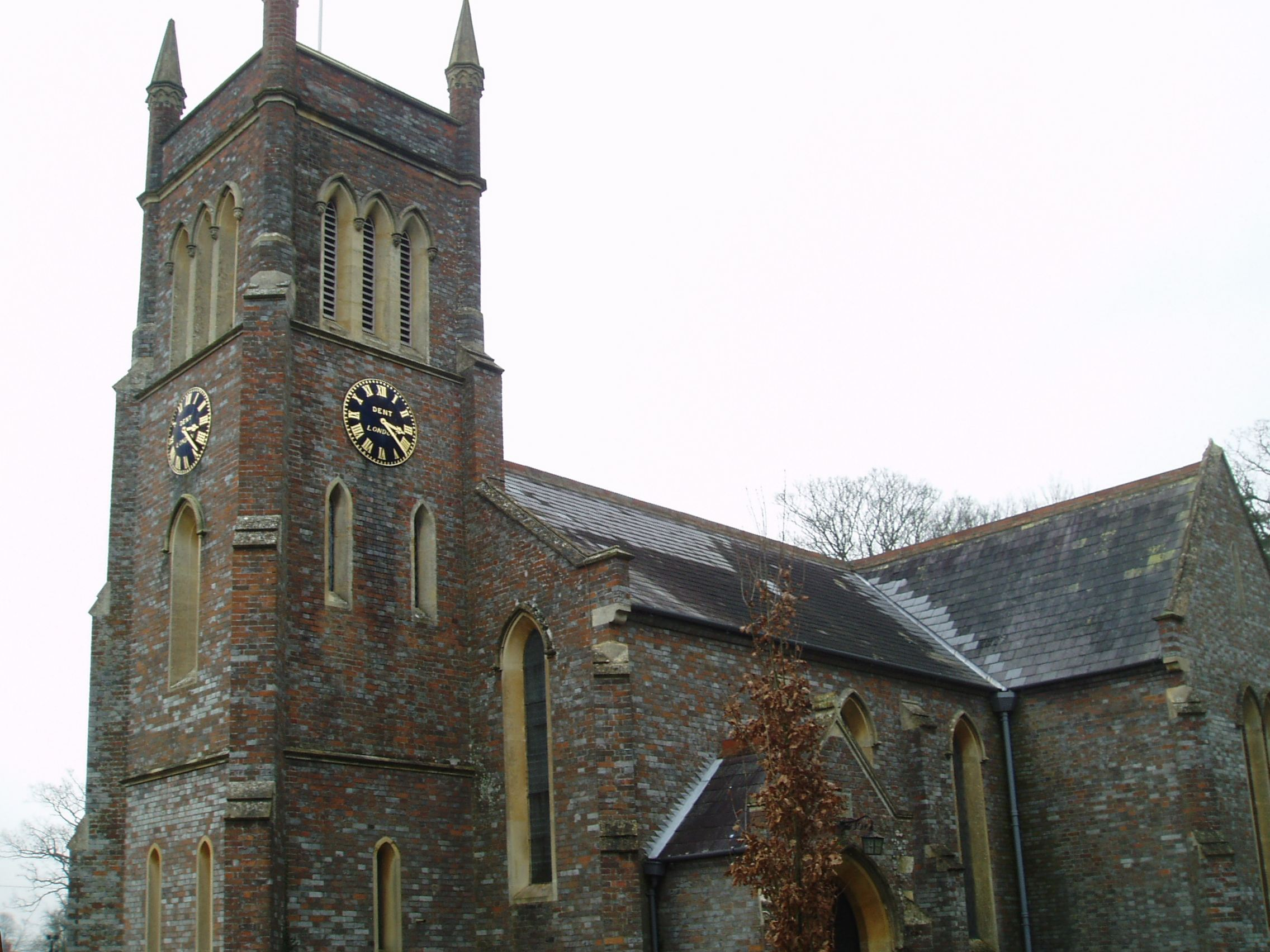
- St John's church

- Location within Berkshire
- OS grid reference: SU4368
- West
- Civil parish: Speen
- Unitary authority: West Berkshire
- Ceremonial county: Berkshire
- Region: South East
- Country: England
- Sovereign state: United Kingdom
- Post town: Newbury
- Postcode district: RG20
- Dialling code: 01488
- Police: Thames Valley
- Fire: Royal Berkshire
- Ambulance: South Central
- UK Parliament: Newbury

Stockcross is a village in Berkshire, England. The village lies to the west of Newbury in the civil parish of Speen and the district of West Berkshire. Close to the cross-road in the middle of the village were the stocks hence the name Stock-Cross, which were removed in the early 1980s.

== Facilities ==
Stockcross has a small combined shop/post office/café. Sutton Hall is the busy village hall, hosting jumble sales, Christmas pantos and other village events. It has a small Christian school.

== Transport ==
The nearest railway station is Newbury. The bus service is Heyfordian Travel route 4 to Newbury and Lambourn.

== Places of worship ==
It is the site of a brick-built church, St John's, erected and endowed by the vicar, the Rev. H. W. Majendie in 1839.

== Hotel and pubs ==
'The Vineyard' is a 5 star hotel on the edge of the village that has a spa and restaurant. The restaurant previously held two Michelin stars, although these were removed when Executive Chef John Campbell left for Dorchester's Coworth Park. Robby Jenks is now Head Chef. The Vineyard was described as "a palace of naffness" by the late restaurant critic Michael Winner. The village has a pub The Rising Sun, a free house serving ales from the region. It is in the CAMRA Good Beer Guide 2017. A second pub was originally called the Nags Head but the name was changed to the Lord Lyon after a racehorse, leased by local landowner Richard Sutton that in 1866 won both the 2000 Guineas and Epsom Derby. The pub is tied to Arkell's Brewery who put the building up for sale in late 2015 and closed the pub in January 2016.

== Nearby places ==
Towns: Newbury, Hungerford

Villages: Bagnor, Marsh Benham, Halfway, Wickham, Welford

== See also ==
- List of places in Berkshire
