= Welford Park railway station =

Former railway station in England

Welford Park
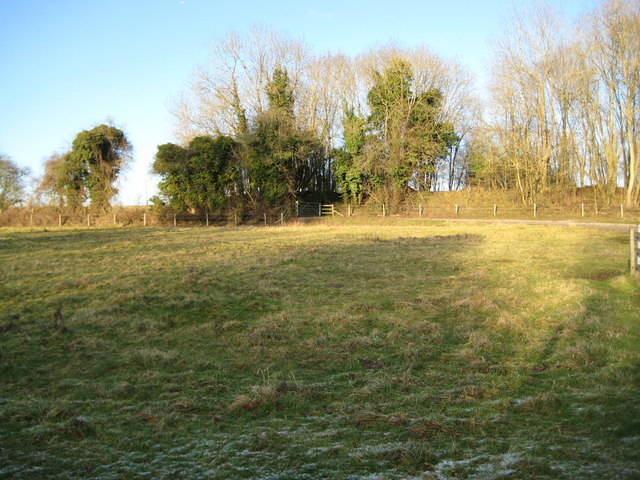
- The site of the station in 2010

General information
- Location: Welford, West Berkshire; England
- Coordinates: 51.4597°N 1.4148°W
- Grid reference: SU408735
- Platforms: 2

Other information
- Status: Disused

History
- Original company: Lambourn Valley Railway
- Pre-grouping: Great Western Railway
- Post-grouping: Great Western Railway

Key dates
- 1898: Opened
- 1960: Closed to passengers
- 1965: Closed for goods(used by military)
- 1972: Military trains ceased
- 3 November 1973: Special final passenger service
Location

Welford Park railway station was a railway station in Welford, Berkshire, England, on the Lambourn Valley Railway.

== History ==
The station opened on 4 April 1898. It was rebuilt by the Great Western Railway in 1908, providing a second platform, a signal box, and a passing loop.

The station had few passenger facilities, and dealt primarily with small goods, including coal, watercress, and timber.

Passenger services ceased on 4 January 1960 and the station closed to all traffic on 19 July 1965. The line was retained to serve a 3-mile (4.8 km) spur line which ran from the station to RAF Welford until closure in 1972. The last trains were a special passenger service from Newbury which ran on 3 November 1973

Preceding station	Disused railways	Following station
Boxford	Great Western Railway; Lambourn Valley Railway	Great Shefford
RAF Welford	Great Western Railway; Welford Airbase Spur	Terminus
