= Boxford railway station =

Disused railway station in England

Boxford
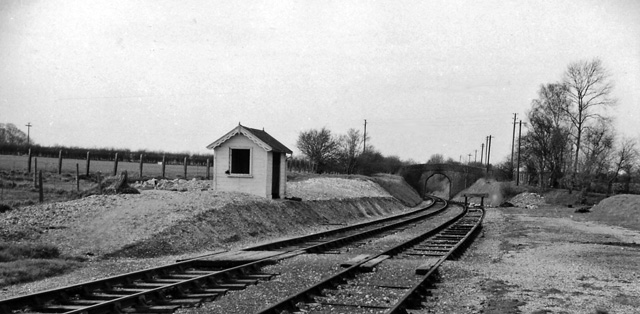
- The remains of Boxford station, before the track was removed

General information
- Location: Boxford, Berkshire; England
- Coordinates: 51.4432°N 1.3906°W
- Grid reference: SU424717
- Platforms: 1

Other information
- Status: Disused

History
- Original company: Lambourn Valley Railway
- Pre-grouping: Great Western Railway
- Post-grouping: Great Western Railway

Key dates
- 1898: Opened
- 1960: Closed
Location

Boxford railway station was a railway station in Boxford, Berkshire, England on the Lambourn Valley Railway.

== History ==
The station opened on 4 April 1898. It was staffed until 1954; between 1904 and 1940 it was overseen by Charlie Brown, a local man employed by the Great Western Railway.

The station had few passenger facilities, and dealt primarily with small goods. Boxford was the first stop on the line with a siding, which also functioned as a passing loop.

The station closed to all traffic in 1960. Until 2020, the station's wooden shelter was used as a bus shelter in the village, after which it was relocated to the Gloucestershire Warwickshire Steam Railway.

Preceding station	Disused railways	Following station
Stockcross and Bagnor Halt	Great Western Railway; Lambourn Valley Railway	Welford Park
