= Great Shefford railway station =

Railway station in Berkshire, England

Great Shefford
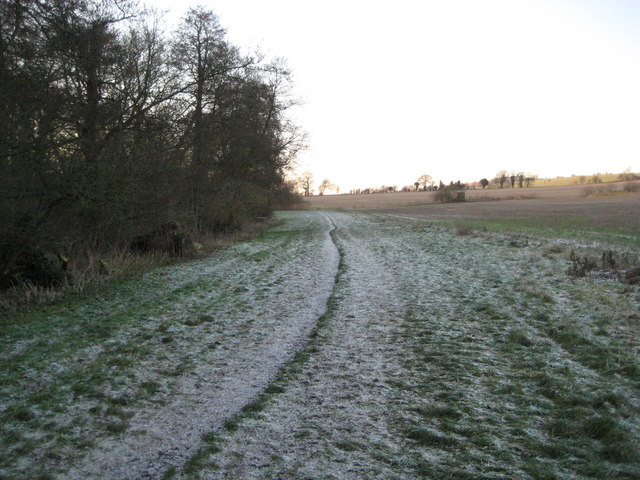
- View looking away from the site of the station towards Lambourn

General information
- Location: Great Shefford, Berkshire; England
- Coordinates: 51.4765°N 1.4486°W
- Grid reference: SU384753
- Platforms: 1

Other information
- Status: Disused

History
- Original company: Lambourn Valley Railway
- Pre-grouping: Great Western Railway
- Post-grouping: Great Western Railway

Key dates
- 1898: Opened as West Shefford
- 1900: Renamed Great Shefford
- 1960: Closed
Location

Great Shefford railway station was a railway station in Great Shefford, Berkshire, England, on the Lambourn Valley Railway.

== History ==
The station opened on 4 April 1898 as West Shefford. It was renamed Great Shefford in November 1900.

In 1923, a crane costing £179 was installed to facilitate the handling of heavy goods – particularly timber. The crane had a loading capacity of 64 tons. The station had a coal yard, and also dealt with dairy produce, livestock, and racehorses.

The station closed to all traffic on 4 January 1960.

Preceding station	Disused railways	Following station
Welford Park	Great Western Railway; Lambourn Valley Railway	East Garston
