= Eastbury, Berkshire =

Village in Berkshire, England

Coordinates: 51°29′29″N 1°29′58″W

Eastbury
- Village
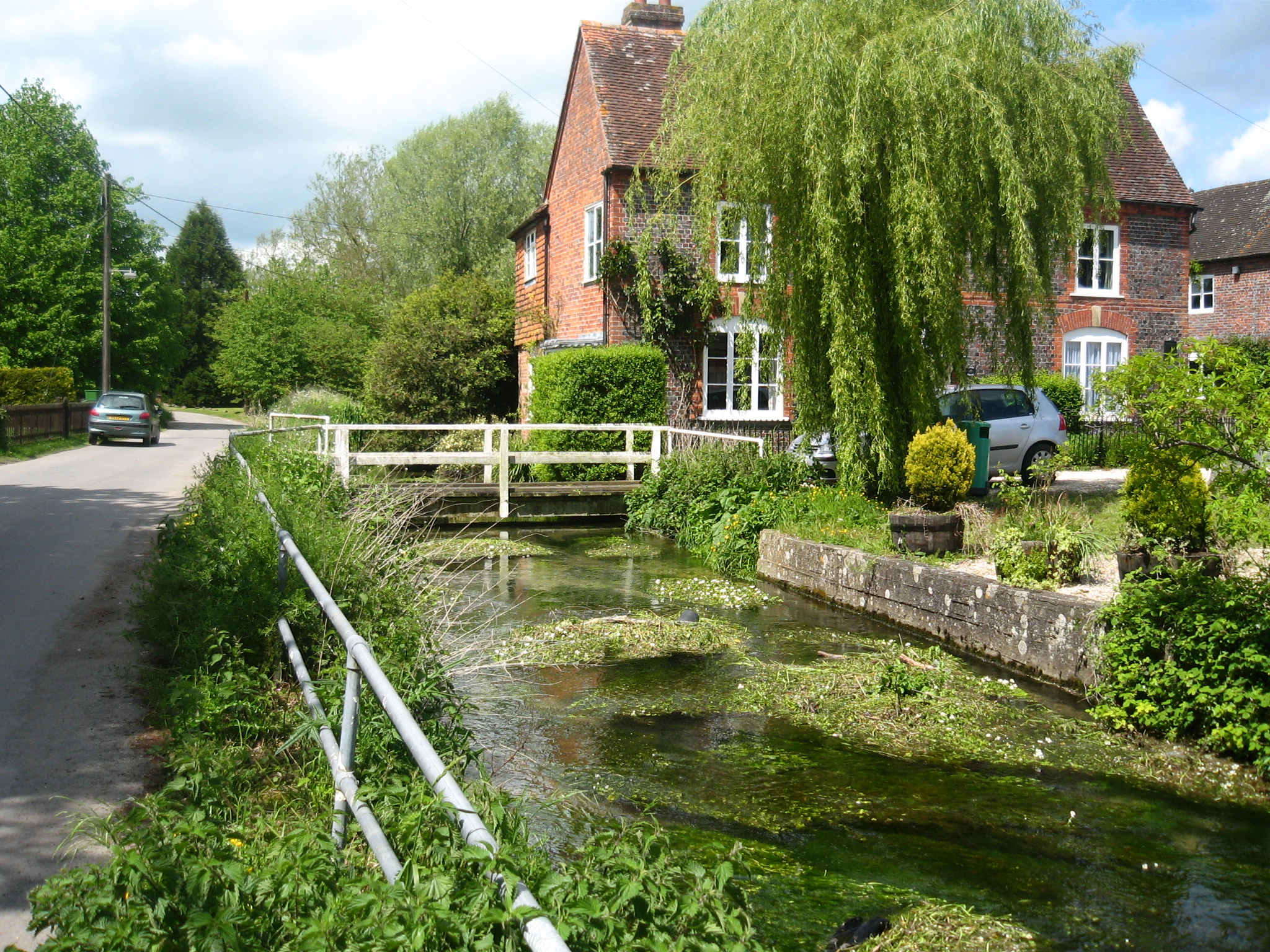
- The River Lambourn in Eastbury

- Location within Berkshire
- OS grid reference: SU347771
- Civil parish: Lambourn
- Unitary authority: West Berkshire
- Ceremonial county: Berkshire
- Region: South East
- Country: England
- Sovereign state: United Kingdom
- Police: Thames Valley
- Fire: Royal Berkshire
- Ambulance: South Central
- UK Parliament: Newbury

Eastbury is a village in the valley of the River Lambourn in West Berkshire, England. The village is situated on the old river level road between Newbury and Lambourn in the Berkshire Downs, 1.5 miles (2.4 km) east of Lambourn and around 10 miles (16 km) north-west of Newbury. The village is situated in the civil parish of Lambourn.

== History ==
The origin of the village's name is obscure, but it likely means the burg east of Lambourn.

The place seems to have been settled from pre-Roman times. The first historical reference to the village is to the 'tithing of Eastbury' in a charter of King Cnut, dating from around 1033. Evidence suggests it was around the same size as Hungerford in 1381, although Hungerford has since significantly outgrown Eastbury.

== Geography ==
Eastbury has three Sites of Special Scientific Interest (SSSI) within close vicinity to the village, these are White Shute, Westfield Farm Chalk Bank and Cleeve Hill.

=== River Lambourn ===
Bernard's Ford on the River Lambourn is found to the west of the village, suitable only for tractors and horses, but there is also a footbridge. Here the river overflowed its banks in July 2007 and flowed down the Newbury Road for over a hundred yards before rejoining the river.

The Lambourn runs through the middle of Eastbury, and past the Plough Inn, which holds the Great Eastbury Duck Race on the river in May.

== Amenities ==
The Plough Inn is the village pub and is a social centre for the village. The building dates from the 18th century.

== Transport ==
From 1898 until 1960, Eastbury Halt railway station, opposite the manor house, served the village. Services to Newbury and Lambourn operated at least three times a day in each direction, except on Sunday. It was originally run by the Lambourn Valley Railway Company and then Great Western Railway. The line suffered a decline on the advent of motor buses.

== Religious sites ==
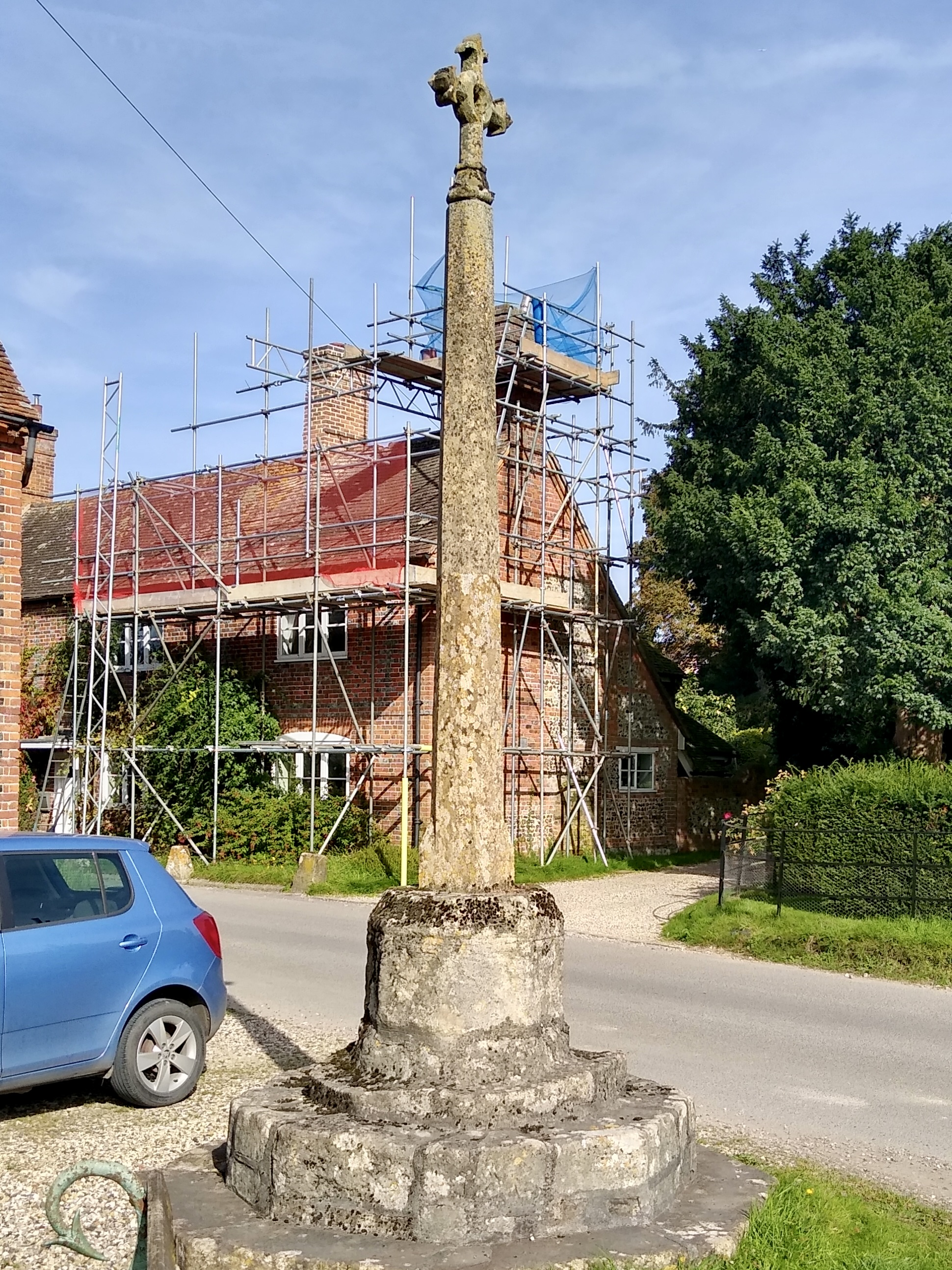
St Antolin's Cross

The church of St James is a mid-Victorian building designed by G E Street and built between 1851 and 1863. It is a Grade II listed building. Street was also responsible for the design and construction of the old school.

St Antolin's Cross, upon which the date 1562 appears, is a historic stone cross in the centre of the village. English Heritage suggests the base dates to the 15th century. The cross is Grade II* listed.

== Notable people ==
Edward Thomas, war poet, lived in the village with his wife, Helen.

== See also ==
- List of places in Berkshire
- Berkshire Downs
