= Eastbury Halt railway station =

Railway station in Eastbury, Berkshire, England

Eastbury Halt
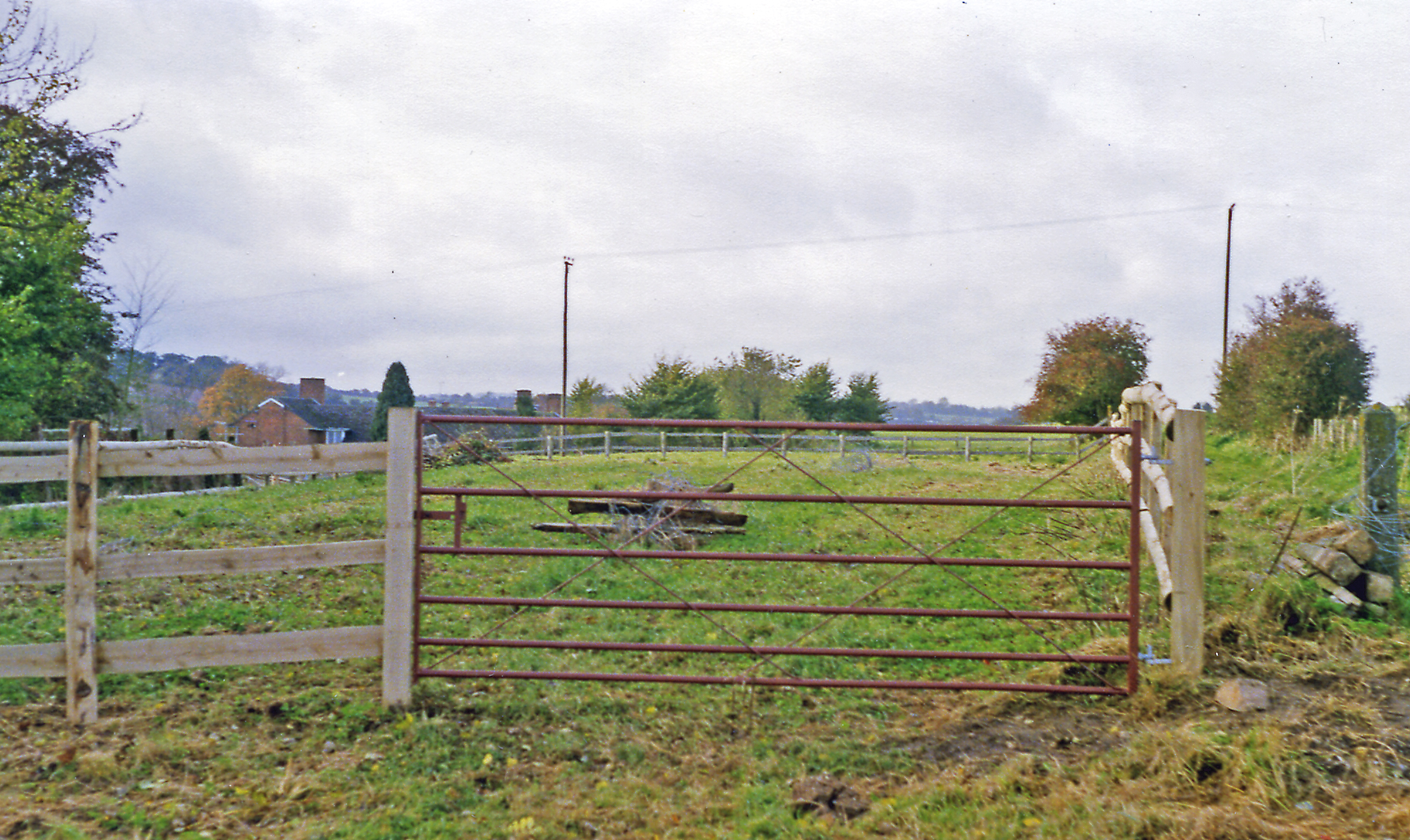
- Site of the station in 1992

General information
- Location: Eastbury, Berkshire; England
- Coordinates: 51.4950°N 1.5033°W
- Grid reference: SU345774
- Platforms: 1

Other information
- Status: Disused

History
- Original company: Lambourn Valley Railway
- Pre-grouping: Great Western Railway
- Post-grouping: Great Western Railway

Key dates
- 1898: Opened as Eastbury
- 1934: Renamed Eastbury Halt
- 1960: Closed
Location

Eastbury Halt railway station was a railway station in Eastbury, Berkshire, England, on the Lambourn Valley Railway.

== History ==
The station opened on 4 April 1898 as Eastbury. The vast majority of the station's traffic was milk; there was little demand for other goods and so the lack of a yard meant that the milk churns would be left on the platform to be collected.

On 9 July 1934, the station became unstaffed and was renamed Eastbury Halt.

The station closed to all traffic on 4 January 1960.

| Preceding station | Disused railways | Following station |
|---|---|---|
| East Garston | Great Western Railway; Lambourn Valley Railway | Lambourn |
