= Great Shefford =

Village in Berkshire, England

Coordinates: 51°28′30″N 1°26′53″W

- Village and civil parish
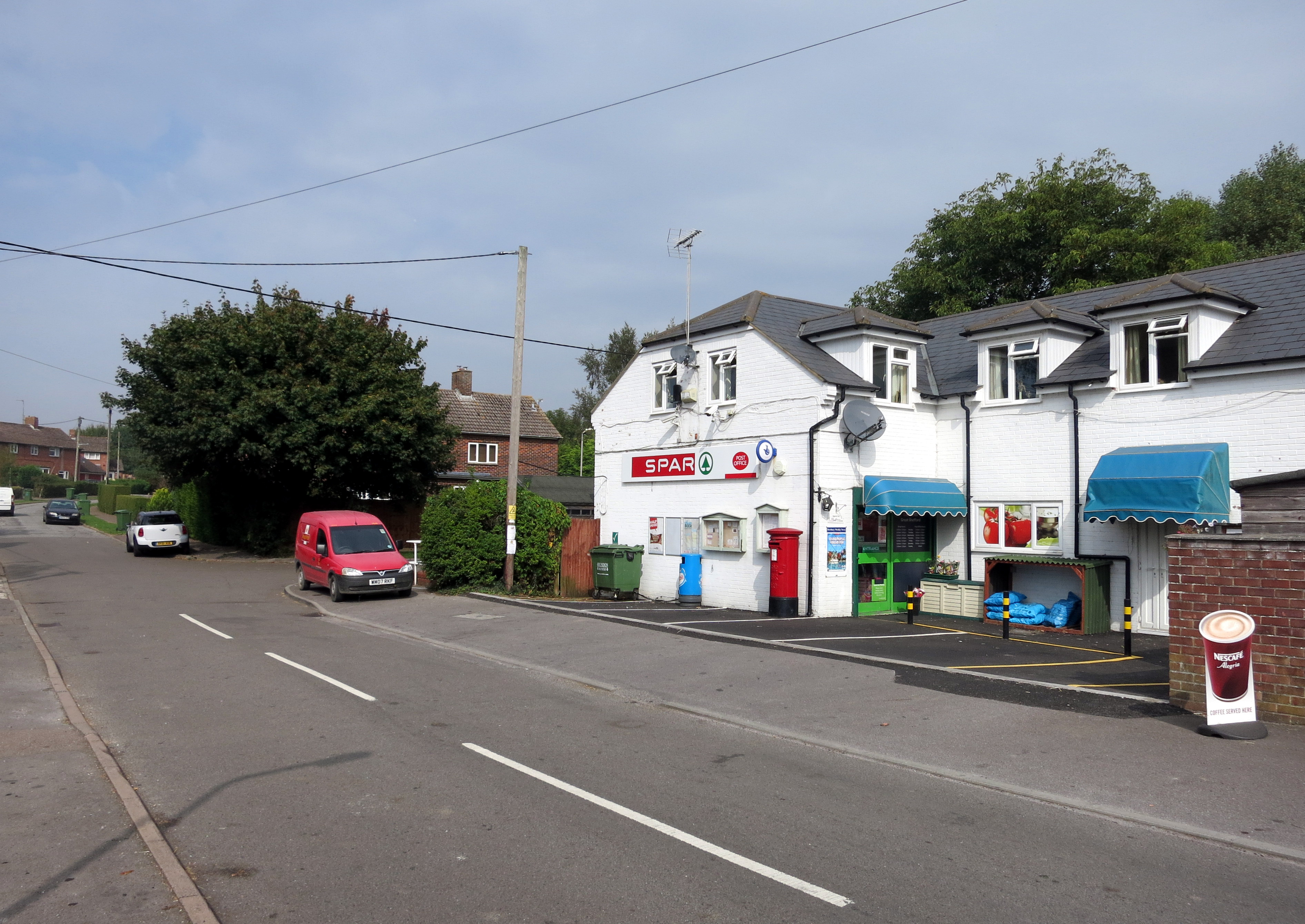
- Combined shop and post office in Great Shefford

- Location within Berkshire
- Area: 13.6 km^{2} (5.3 sq mi)
- Population: 937 (2011 census)
  - Density: 69/km^{2} (180/sq mi)
- OS grid reference: SU3875
- Civil parish: Great Shefford
- Unitary authority: West Berkshire
- Ceremonial county: Berkshire
- Region: South East
- Country: England
- Sovereign state: United Kingdom
- Post town: Hungerford
- Postcode district: RG17
- Dialling code: 01488
- Police: Thames Valley
- Fire: Royal Berkshire
- Ambulance: South Central
- UK Parliament: Newbury
- Website: Great Shefford and Shefford Woodlands

Great Shefford (or West Shefford) is an English village and civil parish on the River Lambourn in the West Berkshire district of Berkshire. The present civil parish includes the historical parish of Little or East Shefford, a small, reduced community downstream. It also covers the village of Shefford Woodlands, about 1.5 miles (2.4 km) south-west of Great Shefford, near Junction 14 on the M4 motorway.

== Churches ==
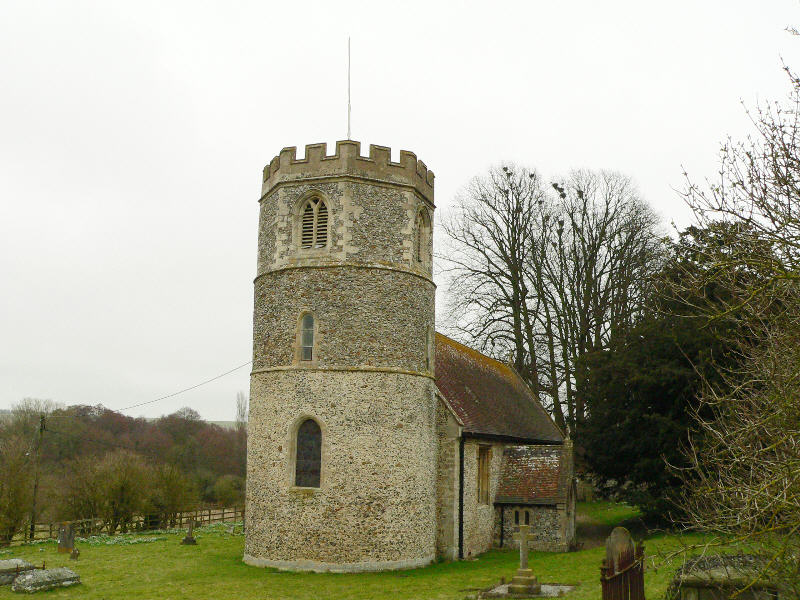
St Mary's parish church

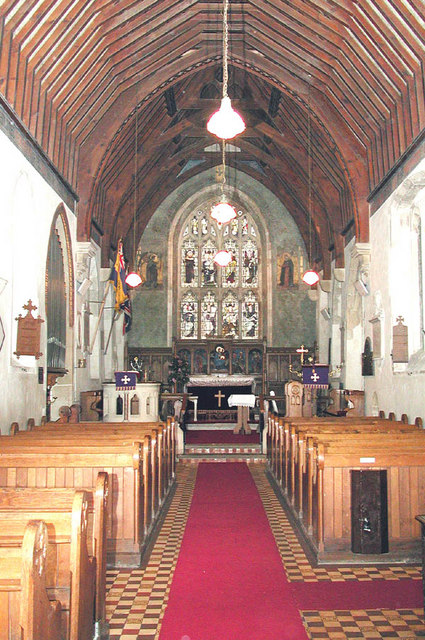
The interior of St Mary's church

=== St Mary ===
The Church of England parish church of St Mary is a Grade II* listed building.

=== St Stephen ===
The church of Saint Stephen at Shefford Woodlands is a former Methodist chapel, taken over as part of Saint Mary Church of England parish church in 1911. The church is a Grade II listed building.

=== St Thomas ===
St Thomas' Church, East Shefford is a redundant church, but listed as a Grade I historic building. It contains monuments to the widespread Fettiplace family.

== Notable people ==
- Richard Brydges (1500–1558), politician, owned and lived at Great Shefford Manor.
- Clive Bell (1881–1964), art critic, was born in East Shefford.
- Harold Balfour, 1st Baron Balfour of Inchrye (1897–1988), Conservative MP and Privy Councillor, died in Great Shefford.
- Brian Cheesman (born 1929), international cricketer, was born in Shefford Woodlands.

== Transport ==
Reading Buses route 4 (Newbury–Lambourn) serves Great Shefford. From 1898 until 1960 the parish included Great Shefford railway station on the Lambourn Valley Railway. The north-south A338 between Wantage and Hungerford runs through the village

== Demography ==
The 2011 Census recorded a parish population of 937, and 880 are listed on the Millennium Stone opposite the petrol station. The population had grown by about 5 per cent since the 2011 census.

2011 Published Statistics: Population, home ownership and extracts from Physical Environment, surveyed in 2005
Output area	Homes owned outright	Owned with a loan	Socially rented	Privately rented	Other	km^{2} roads	km^{2} water	km^{2} domestic gardens	Usual residents	km^{2}
Civil parish	126	146	50	70	9	0.258	0.039	0.246	937	13.6

== Sources ==
- Page, W. H.; Ditchfield, P.H., eds. (1924). A History of the County of Berkshire, Volume 4. Victoria County History. pp. 238–242.
- Pevsner, Nikolaus (1966). Berkshire. The Buildings of England. Harmondsworth: Penguin Books. pp. 148–149.
