= East Garston railway station =

Railway station in Berkshire, England

East Garston
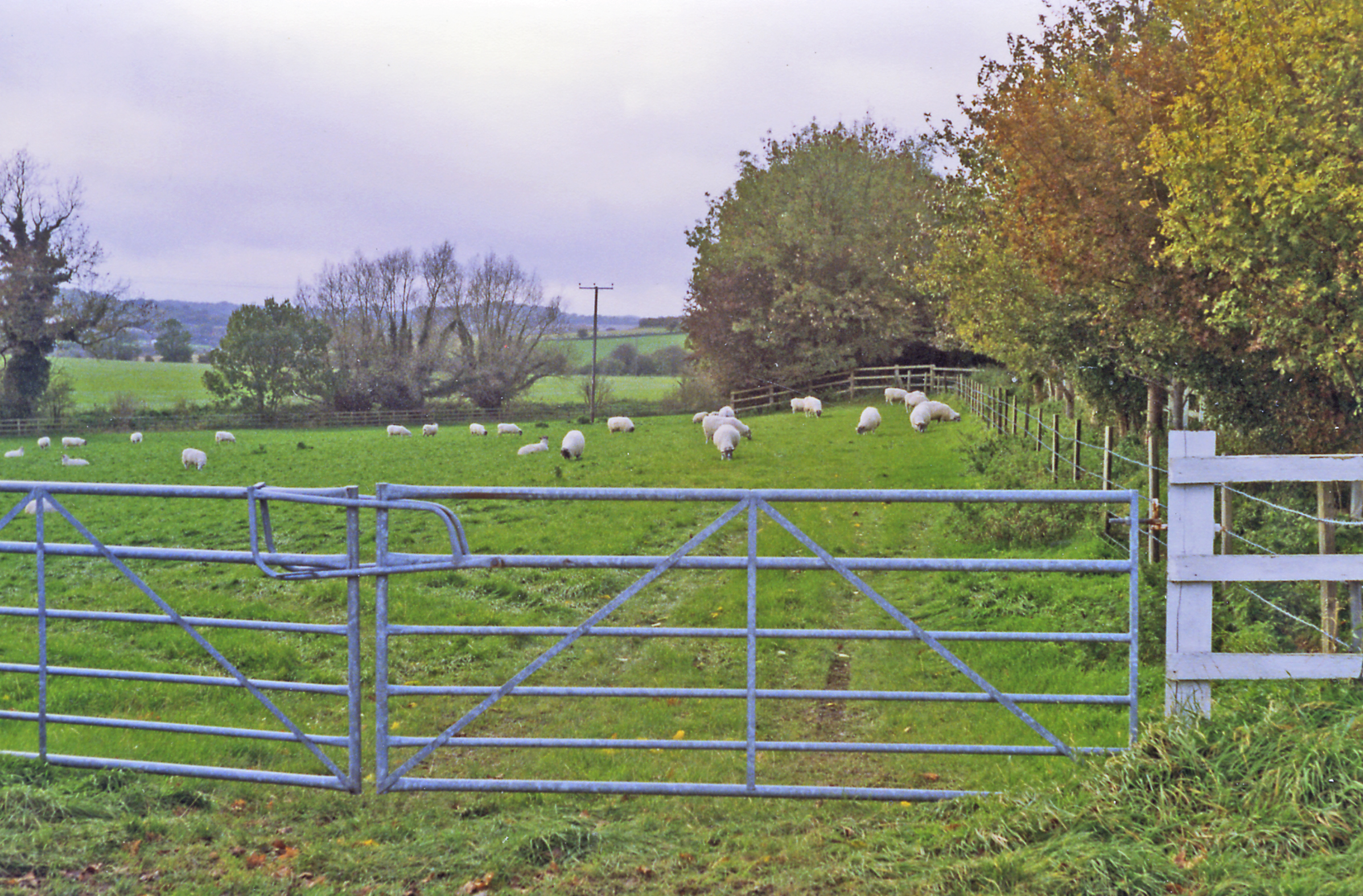
- The site of the station in 1992

General information
- Location: East Garston, Berkshire; England
- Coordinates: 51.4908°N 1.4793°W
- Grid reference: SU362769
- Platforms: 1

Other information
- Status: Disused

History
- Original company: Lambourn Valley Railway
- Pre-grouping: Great Western Railway
- Post-grouping: Great Western Railway

Key dates
- 1898: Opened
- 1960: Closed
Location

East Garston railway station was a railway station in East Garston, Berkshire, England, on the Lambourn Valley Railway.

== History ==
The station opened on 4 April 1898. The station primarily handled dairy produce, particularly milk churns. A coal yard at the station supplied local provided materials for local merchants.

The station closed to all traffic on 4 January 1960.

Preceding station	Disused railways	Following station
Great Shefford	Great Western Railway; Lambourn Valley Railway	Eastbury Halt
