= Speen, Berkshire =

Coordinates: 51°24′35″N 1°20′30″W

Speen
- Village and civil parish
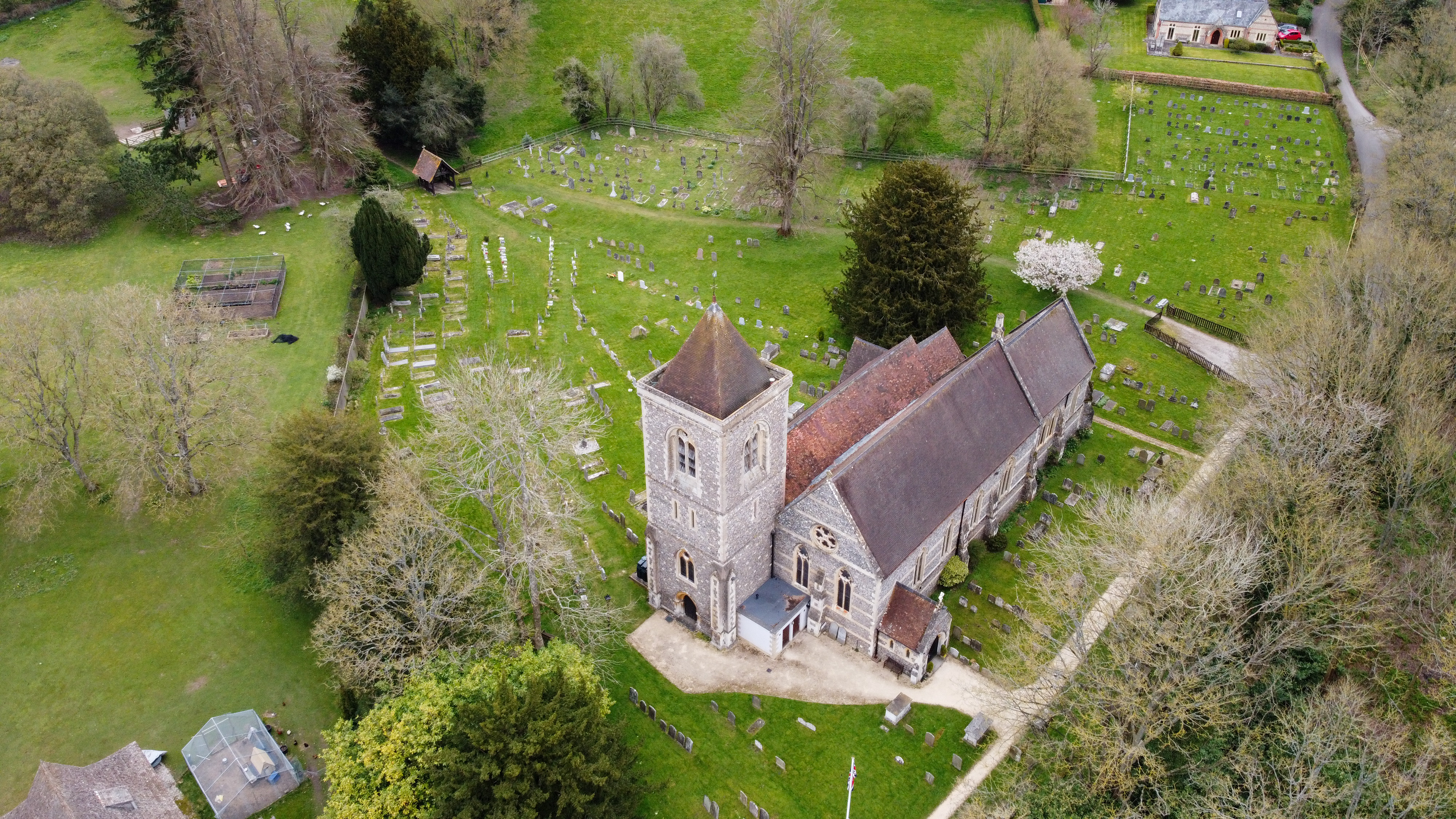
- St Mary the Virgin parish church

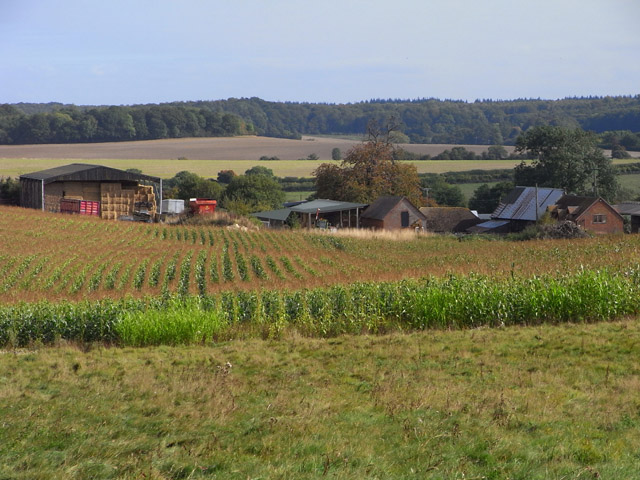
- Maize fields and the Lambourn, Woodspeen, Speen

- Location within Berkshire
- Area: 14.53 km^{2} (5.61 sq mi)
- Population: 2,635 (2011 census)
  - Density: 181/km^{2} (470/sq mi)
- OS grid reference: SU4568
- Civil parish: Speen
- Unitary authority: West Berkshire
- Ceremonial county: Berkshire
- Region: South East
- Country: England
- Sovereign state: United Kingdom
- Post town: Newbury
- Postcode district: RG14
- Dialling code: 01635
- Police: Thames Valley
- Fire: Royal Berkshire
- Ambulance: South Central
- UK Parliament: Newbury

Speen is a suburb, village and civil parish in West Berkshire, England. It is 2 miles (3 km) north west of the town of Newbury, Speen has clustered settlements, the largest of which is Speen village, which is contiguous with Newbury, and the others, buffered from the town by the A34 road, are Bagnor, Stockcross, Woodspeen and Marsh Benham. Its other land is an approximately even mixture of woodland and agricultural fields including hay meadows for livestock feed and pasture. The area varies greatly in elevation, having the Reading to Taunton Line alongside the north bank of the River Kennet as its southern boundary and both banks of the River Lambourn in its north with elevated ground in between. Benham Park in the south-west of the area is a listed landscape garden and house.

== History ==
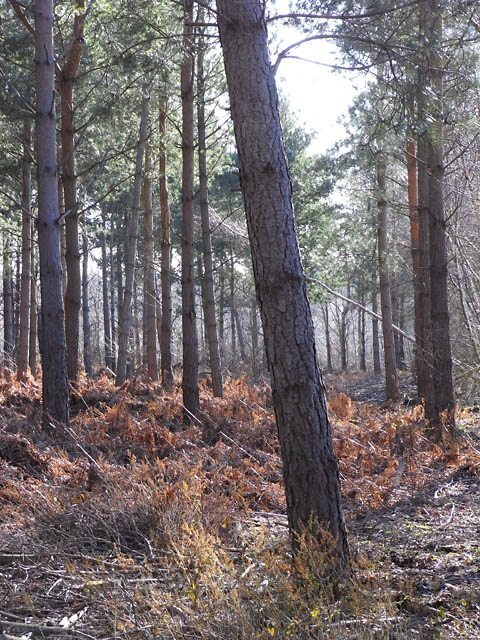
Wickham Heath

Wickham Heath occupies the far west of the parish and has plantations of trees, such as conifers which are felled for pulp and wood products. Speen has the frequently interrupted footpath marking the Ermin Way, the main Roman road from Corinium Dobunnorum (Cirencester) to Calleva Atrebatum (Silchester). The Second Battle of Newbury during the English Civil War was fought at Speen on 27 October 1644. Speenhamland in the parish, now part of Newbury, was the home of the Speenhamland system of outdoor relief.

== Landmarks ==
=== Parish church ===
The Church of England parish church of Saint Mary the Virgin is late Saxon and is the oldest church in Berkshire. It is the burial place of Giovanni Battista Castiglione (1515–98), Elizabeth I's Italian tutor and servant, who was given the nearby Benham Valence house and park in 1570.

=== The Ladywell or lady well ===
The church was built near one of the holy wells of Christendom, which, is as with many wells, an enlarged spring. Tenuous local tradition says its water is able to cure eye diseases and other ills, and there have been reports it is haunted. Some of the village people have seen an old woman with white hair and wearing a blue rain mac wandering around the grave yard and up the path the well is situated on. The Ladywell was fenced off in the Victorian era.

=== Speen House ===
Next to the above sites are ramparts around the elevated Speen House, the latest incarnation of Speen manor house, which is mostly late 18th century, but incorporates a minority of building materials from its 17th century predecessor. Early historians have dated a few stones among the foundations to the Roman village of Spinae, but it is more likely that these oldest stones were sourced and hewn for the late medieval manor house, nothing else of which survives.

=== Benham Park ===
Benham Park or Benham Valence Manor, is a landscape garden by Capability Brown, centred on the house built by Henry Holland for William, 6th Baron Craven in 1775. It was later the home of his widow, Elizabeth, and her second husband, the Margrave of Anspach. Both the house and park are Grade II* listed. One of its pairs of grand and ornate gate piers (pilasters) is separately Grade I listed.

== Transport ==
Speen railway station, on the Lambourn Valley Railway, served the parish until it was closed in 1960. The nearest railway station now is Newbury.

The A34 road cuts through the middle of the parish in a roughly straight line north–south. It has the nucleus of the village to its east close to one of the three Newbury junctions and the road proceeds to a junction with the M4 Motorway at Chieveley. There are local bus services to Newbury, Lambourn and Hungerford.

== Demography ==
2011 Published Statistics: Population, home ownership and extracts from Physical Environment, surveyed in 2005
Output area	Homes owned outright	Owned with a loan	Socially rented	Privately rented	Other	km^{2} roads	km^{2} water	km^{2} domestic gardens	Usual residents	km^{2}
Civil parish	378	338	168	173	28	0.340	0.350	0.623	2635	14.53
