= Welford, Berkshire =

Coordinates: 51°27′22″N 1°24′43″W

Welford
- Village and civil parish
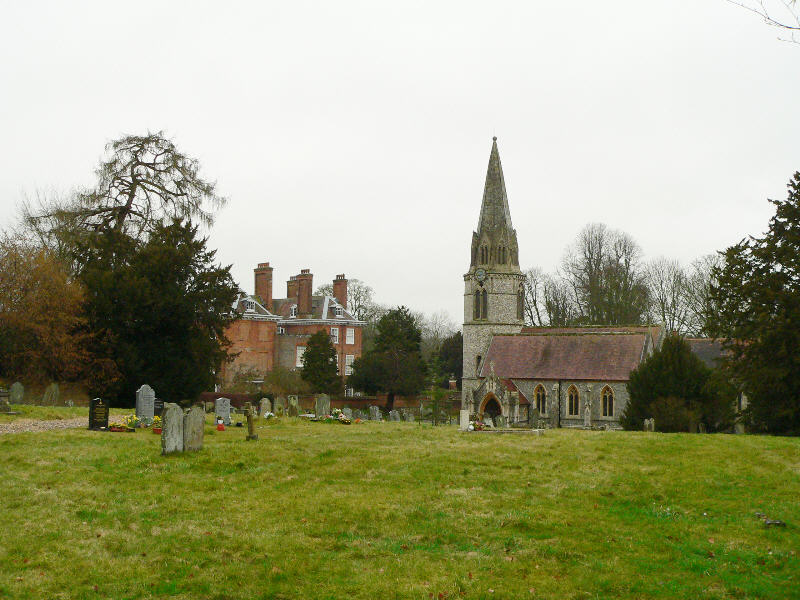
- St. Gregory's parish church and the rear of Welford Park House

- Location within Berkshire
- Area: 20.39 km^{2} (7.87 sq mi)
- Population: 513 (2011 census)
  - Density: 25/km^{2} (65/sq mi)
- OS grid reference: SU4073
- Civil parish: Welford
- Unitary authority: West Berkshire
- Ceremonial county: Berkshire
- Region: South East
- Country: England
- Sovereign state: United Kingdom
- Post town: Newbury
- Postcode district: RG20
- Dialling code: 01488
- Police: Thames Valley
- Fire: Royal Berkshire
- Ambulance: South Central
- UK Parliament: Newbury

Welford is a rural village and civil parish in West Berkshire, England occupying both sides of the valley of the River Lambourn north-west of Newbury and south of Wantage. It forms a strip parish which tapers in the south where it contains the hamlet of Halfway. It incorporates Welford Park with its annual snowdrop displays. The M4 motorway passes through the parish, but has no junctions within it. RAF Welford, a munitions depot used by the United States Air Force, is to the north of the village.

== Notable buildings ==
=== Welford Park house ===
The history of the manor is long. It was held by Abingdon Abbey for centuries until the Dissolution of the Monasteries. Overlordship was for some decades after in the hands of the Crown, and was attached to the manor of Benham Lovell, while the overlordship of the vill of Easton Welford was attached to the manor of East Greenwich. Its history included a share held by Thomas Knyvet and within 20 years was sold to Francis Jones in the 1600s. It descended in the same family to the Mason, Archer and Houblon branches. The main vestige is the rebuilt manor house at Welford Park, which can be visited for its woodlands and early spring displays of snowdrops. It was described in a county history and geography of 1924 as a "large modern red brick building, surrounded by a medieval deer park of 200 acres (81 ha). It is the property of the lord of the manor, Col. G. B. Archer-Houblon, but...the residence of Major R. P. Cobbold."

=== Saint Gregory's church ===
The Church of England parish church of St Gregory is one of only two existing round-tower churches in Berkshire, the other being St Mary's at Great Shefford which adjoins the parish to the north-west. The church is a Grade II* listed building.

== Transport ==
The village was formerly served by Welford Park railway station on the Lambourn Valley Railway, but the line closed to passenger traffic in 1960 and to freight traffic, to and from RAF Welford, in the 1970s. The station site is now a car park for visitors to Welford Park. The village is situated midway between junctions 13 and 14 of the M4.

== Demography ==
2011 Published Statistics: Population, home ownership and extracts from Physical Environment, surveyed in 2005
Output area	Homes owned outright	Owned with a loan	Socially rented	Privately rented	Other	km^{2} roads	km^{2} water	km^{2} domestic gardens	Usual residents	km^{2}
Civil parish	62	52	31	53	11	0.349	0.139	0.202	513	20.39
