= Giovanni Battista Castiglione =

Tutor to Tudor Princess Elizabeth (later Queen)

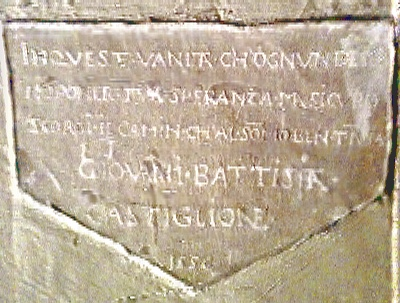
Graffiti by Castiglione in the Tower of London

Giovanni Battista Castiglione (1516–1598) was the Italian tutor to Princess (later Queen) Elizabeth I, appointed Groom of the Privy Chamber from 1559. It is speculated that he taught Prince (later King) Edward VI.

A humanist reformer, Castiglione was imprisoned in the Tower of London in 1556 by Princess Elizabeth's sister, Queen Mary, accused of sedition being so severely tortured that he was left permanently lame. Later, he carried Princess Elizabeth's letters from when she was imprisoned in the Tower.

== Life ==
Born at Gassino Torinese near Turin in Piedmont, son of Captain Piero Castiglione, of Mantua, he served in the Army of the Holy Roman Emperor Charles V at Landrecies and Boulogne-sur-Mer; and Lady of Candia, of Canavese.

Castiglione was appointed to the young Princess Elizabeth's household as Master of the Italian Tongue in November 1544, becoming upon her accession to the Throne Groom of the Privy Chamber, which post he held until shortly before his death. Granted by the Crown the manor of Benham Valence in Berkshire, he became seated there and is buried at the parish church of St Mary's, Speen.

In 1558, Castiglione married at St Olave's Church in the City of London, Margherita Alleyn (1535–1622), widow of Lazarus Alleyn and illegitimate daughter of expatriate Florentine merchant Bartolomeo Compagni (1503–1561), by whom he had a large family.

One son, Sir Francis Castilion (1561–1638) became a pensioner of James I and Member of Parliament for Great Bedwyn. Another son, Captain Peter Castilion, was a professional soldier who settled in Ireland and married Thomasine Peyton, daughter of Sir Christopher Peyton, Auditor-General of Ireland. One of his daughters, Elizabeth Castilion, married Peter Leigh, brother of the Blessed Richard Leigh.
