= Wickham, Berkshire =

Coordinates: 51°26′38″N 1°25′55″W

Wickham
- Village
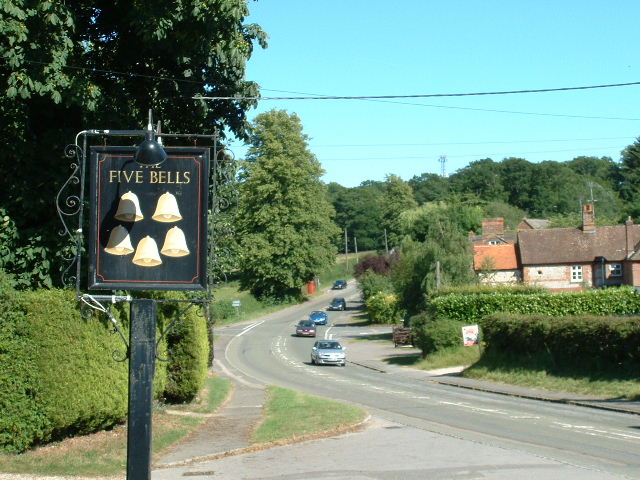
- Baydon Road

- Location within Berkshire
- OS grid reference: SU3971
- Civil parish: Welford
- Unitary authority: West Berkshire
- Ceremonial county: Berkshire
- Region: South East
- Country: England
- Sovereign state: United Kingdom
- Post town: Newbury
- Postcode district: RG20
- Dialling code: 01488
- Police: Thames Valley
- Fire: Royal Berkshire
- Ambulance: South Central
- UK Parliament: Newbury

Wickham is a village about 5.5 miles (8.9 km) north-west of Newbury, Berkshire, England. The M4 motorway passes just north of it. It is in the civil parish of Welford.

== History ==
Wickham is on the course of a Roman road that linked Calleva Atrebatum (Silchester) with Corinium Dobunnorum (Cirencester). Many traces have been found in the parish of Welford of habitation in Roman Britain. The Domesday Book recorded five watermills in the manor of Welford, but it is not clear if any of these were at Wickham. No later record is known of any mill in the parish. By 1275–76 an annual royal fair was held at Wickham. In 1924 there was still an annual Wickham Feast on St Swithin's patronal festival, 15 July. An open field system of farming prevailed until 1820, when the common lands of Wickham and most of the rest of Welford parish were inclosed. By 1924 Welford parish had an elementary school at Wickham.

== Parish church ==
The Church of England parish church of St Swithin has an Anglo-Saxon tower, built probably in the 11th century. It seems to have been built originally as a free-standing defensive tower. Later a nave and small chancel were added to form a chapel of ease for Wickham, which in the Middle Ages was a hamlet of Welford. By the time of the Domesday Book in 1086 the Benedictine Abingdon Abbey seems to have held the parish church at Welford and its chapel at Wickham. During the reign of Henry I, between 1100 and 1135, St. Swithin's had to provide 40 pounds (18 kg) of candle-wax per year for the altar at Abingdon Abbey. In 1396 St. Swithin's paid 50 shillings per year to the Abbey in lieu of 100 pounds (45 kg) of candle-wax.

A Jacobean pulpit was installed in Saint Swithin's in 1629 and a north aisle was added in 1827. The church tower has only one bell. It was cast in 1617 and bears the initials "R P". In 1845 the nave, chancel and north aisle were all demolished. Between 1845 and 1849 a new church was built with a nave, chancel and both north and south aisles in a Decorated Gothic style, and a Norman Revival style bell-chamber was added to the top of the tower. All were designed by the Gothic Revival architect Benjamin Ferrey, who included carved "Norfolk angels" supporting the nave roof and eight papier maché elephants' heads appearing to support the aisle roof. The pipe organ built in 1851 was by Henry Bevington. The church is a Grade II* listed building.

== Wickham House ==
A rectory at Wickham seems to have been built during the reign of Henry II, between 1154 and 1189. However, the present building dates from the 18th century. Benjamin Ferrey greatly enlarged and altered it, adding a tower, spire and remarkable Gothic Revival bay windows. The Jacobean pulpit from St Swithin's was dismantled and its panels used to make a cupboard in the servants' hall of the house. In 1852 St. Gregory's parish church at Welford was also demolished and a new Gothic Revival church built in its place. Extensive carved stonework was salvaged from St. Gregory's and re-used to decorate the rectory garden at Wickham.

A vinery was built using six Perpendicular Gothic windows, five being 15th-century originals and the sixth a modern copy. A 15th-century doorway and some 13th-century windows were also included in the vinery. Elsewhere in the garden, two 15th-century piers from the south aisle and many other fragments from St. Gregory's were set up. The remains of St. Gregory's were still in the rectory garden in 1924 but all had been demolished before 1966, along with the tall spire on the house. The building is no longer a rectory and is now called Wickham House and is a Grade II listed building.

== Sources ==
- Page, William; Ditchfield, P.H., eds. (1924). Victoria County History: A History of the County of Berkshire, Volume 4. pp. 116–125.
- Pevsner, Nikolaus (1966). The Buildings of England: Berkshire. Harmondsworth: Penguin Books. p. 266.
