= Benham Park =

Country house in Berkshire, England

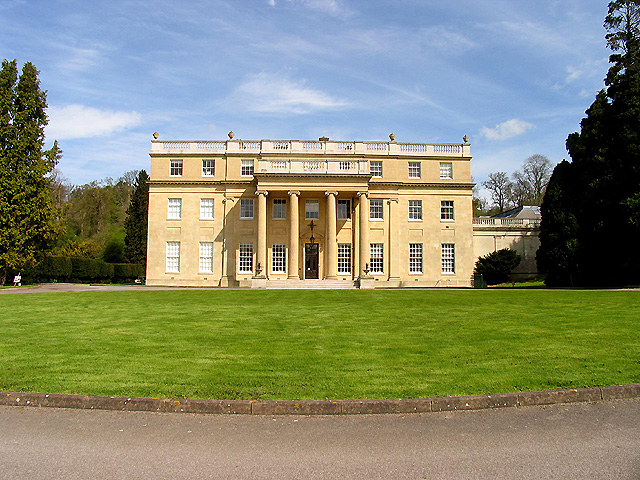
- Benham Park

- Location within Berkshire

General information
- Location: Speen, Berkshire, England
- Coordinates: 51.40479°N 1.36164°W
- Year built: 1772–75

Listed Building – Grade II*
- Official name: Benham Park
- Designated: 6 June 1952
- Reference no.: 1220740

Listed Building – Grade I
- Official name: Gate piers and gates at Benham Park, west lodge
- Designated: 6 June 1952
- Reference no.: 1220645

Listed Building – Grade II
- Official name: Gate piers and gates at Benham Park, east lodge
- Designated: 6 April 1967
- Reference no.: 1220643

National Register of Historic Parks and Gardens
- Official name: Benham Park
- Type: Grade II
- Designated: 30 September 1987
- Reference no.: 1000173

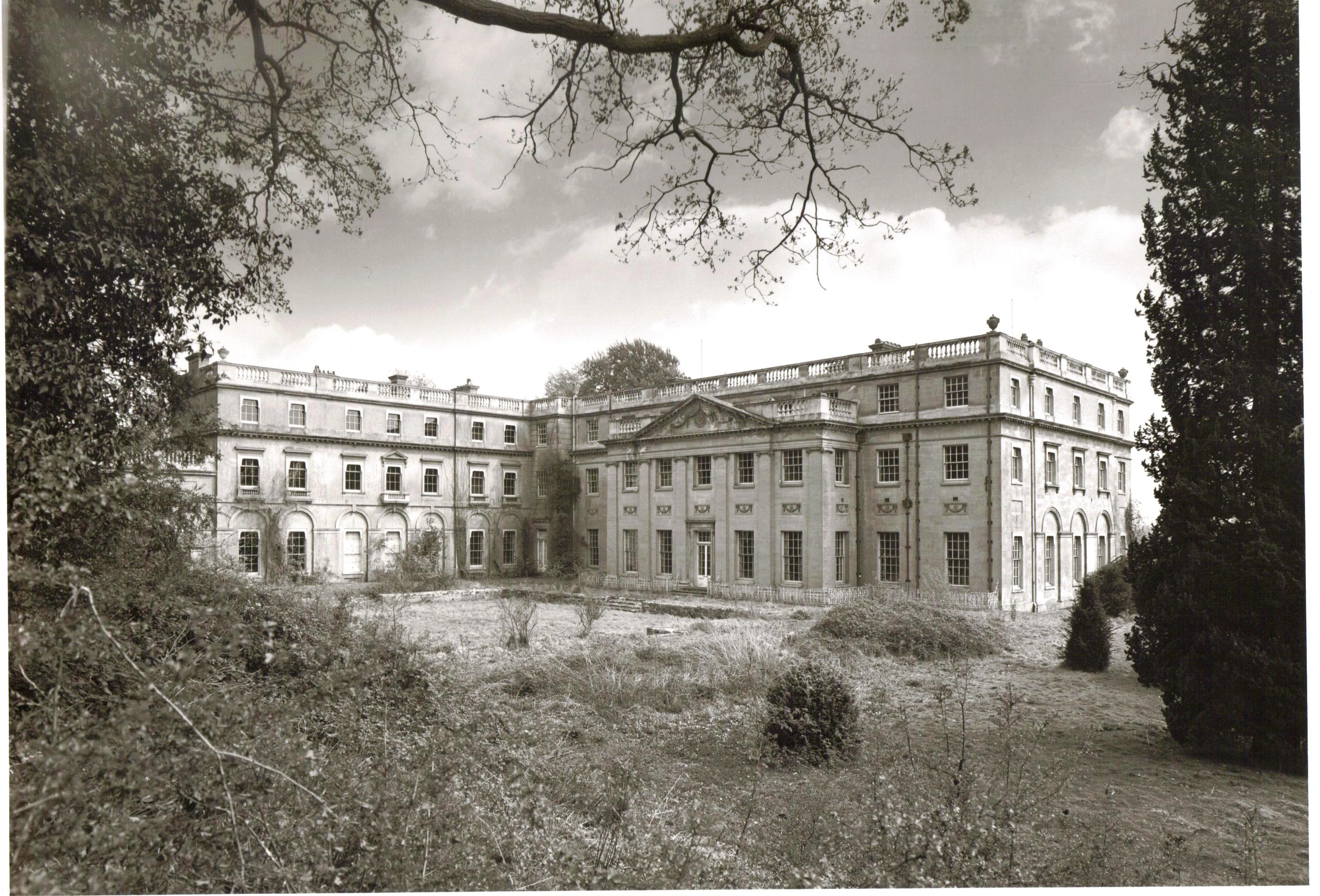
The Valence photographed in 1904

Benham Park is a mansion (on the site of Benham Valence Manor) in the English ceremonial county of Berkshire and district of West Berkshire. It is 2 miles (3.2 km) west of Newbury within 500 metres (1,600 ft) of a junction of the A34 trunk road Newbury bypass outside the town side, in the Marsh Benham locality of Speen, a village within and outside the Newbury bypass. The house is a Grade II* listed building and the park is Grade II.

== Architecture and history ==
The manor of Benham Valence was granted by Elizabeth I to Giovanni Battista Castiglione, her Italian tutor, in 1570. He is buried at St Mary's Church in Speen.

The current house was built between 1772–1775, and designed by Henry Holland and Capability Brown, for William Craven, 6th Baron Craven. It was later the home of his widow, Elizabeth, and her second husband, Alexander, Margrave of Brandenburg-Ansbach. The building was three storeys tall, nine bays wide, in a plain neoclassical style, of stone, with a tetrastyle Ionic portico.

The house was greatly altered in 1914; the portico at the rear of the house (facing the Great Lake) had its pediment removed and replaced by a stone balustrade. The roof was lowered in pitch and hidden behind a balustrade decorated at regular intervals. The servants' quarters (on the top left hand side of the house behind the loggia) were also demolished due to poor structural condition. However, the Circular Hall in the centre of the building, with its large niches and fine plasterwork, is probably as designed by Holland; it has an opening in the ceiling rising to the galleried floor above and a glazed dome. The principal staircase is also original.

The house is Grade II* listed, and one of its pairs of 17th-century ornate stone gate piers, removed from Hamstead Marshall, is Grade I listed. The park itself is Grade II listed and has a lake with a mill beside the house and aqueducts or artificial drains leading across marshy wetland to the River Kennet to the far south.

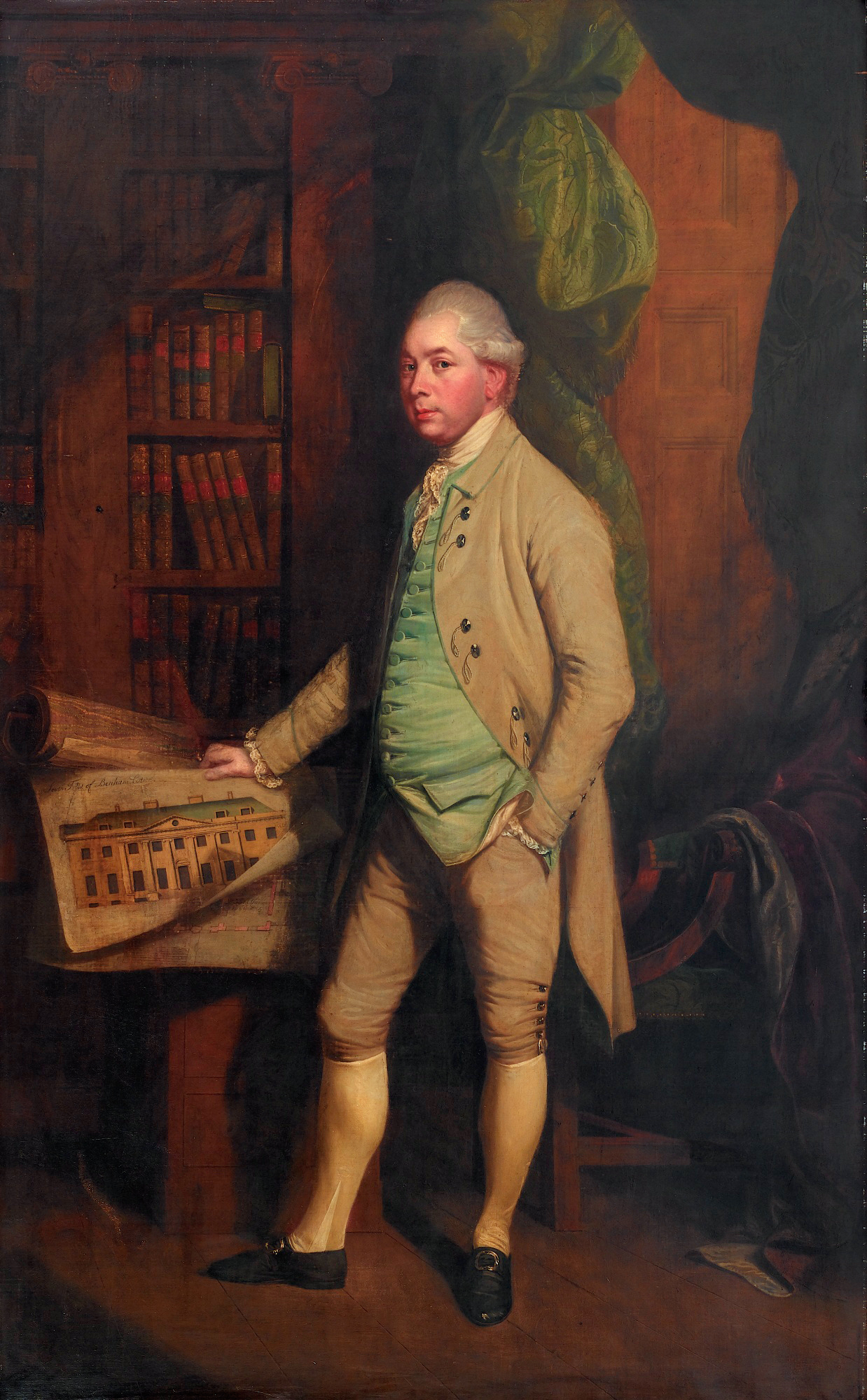
William, 6th Baron Craven, holding the Benham plans (by Thomas Beach, 1778)

In the late 19th and early 20th century, Benham Place was the family seat of the Sutton baronets. Sir Richard Lexington Sutton sold Benham Park and 140 acres (57 ha) in 1982.

The building was converted into offices in 1983 by the IT company Norsk Data, who used it as their headquarters for European operations (outside Norway), until the company's dissolution in 2003, with large parts being acquired by 2e2. Then it was home to 2e2, an ICT lifecycle services provider, until 2012 when it dissolved. Also within the grounds were two office buildings built in the 1980s and these housed other companies such as mobile data solution provider CognitoIQ, Exony and Idox, all of which have now moved to other premises as the phases comprising the office block were demolished.

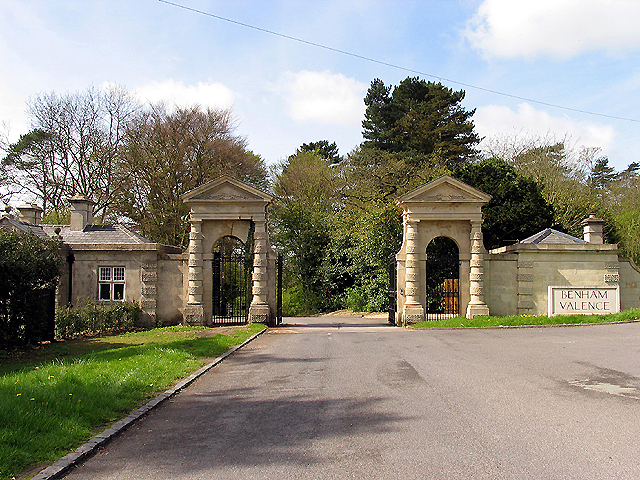
Gates to Benham Valence, originally at Hamstead Marshall

== See also ==
- Grade II* listed buildings in Berkshire
