= Miss Read =

English novelist

- Born: Dora Jessie Shafe; 17 April 1913; South Norwood, London, England
- Died: 7 April 2012 (aged 98); Shefford Woodlands, Berkshire, England
- Education: Homerton College, Cambridge

Dora Jessie Saint MBE (17 April 1913 – 7 April 2012), née Shafe, best known by the pen name Miss Read, was an English novelist and, by profession, a schoolmistress. Her pseudonym was derived from her mother's maiden name. She is best known for two series of novels set in the English countryside, the Fairacre novels and the Thrush Green novels.

== Biography ==
Dora Jessie Shafe was born on 17 April 1913 in London, the younger of the daughters of Arthur Shafe, an insurance agent, and his wife Grace. For the sake of her mother's health, the family moved to the country when Dora was seven, and she began school in Chelsfield, near Orpington, Kent, and later joined her older sister at Bromley county school. When her father became a schoolmaster, Dora followed his example and undertook teacher training at Homerton College, Cambridge.

From 1933 to 1940 she taught in Middlesex, first at Hayes and then at Ealing.

In 1940 she married Douglas Saint; they had one daughter, Jill.

After World War II she worked occasionally as a teacher, and began writing about schools and country topics for several magazines, including Punch and the Times Educational Supplement. She also worked as a scriptwriter for the BBC schools service.

In 1953 a piece of her writing was spotted in the Observer and she was approached by a book publisher to create a book. 70,000 words was a challenge as she had never written more than a thousand.

From 1955 to 1996 Saint wrote a series of novels centered on two fictional villages, Fairacre and Thrush Green. The first Fairacre novel appeared in 1955, the last in 1996. The first Thrush Green novel appeared in 1959. The principal character in the Fairacre books, Miss Read, is an unmarried schoolteacher in a small village school, an acerbic and yet compassionate observer of village life. Saint's novels are wry regional social comedies, laced with gentle humour and subtle social commentary. Saint was also a keen observer of nature and the changing seasons.

Many of the village novels were illustrated by J.S. (John Strickland) Goodall (1908-1996), an artist and picture-book author in his own right.

Saint also wrote two volumes of autobiography, A Fortunate Grandchild (1982) and Time Remembered (1986); the two were issued together in 1995 as Early Days.

Saint wrote 28 novels, 2 autobiographies and 14 other books; her books were translated into several languages including Japanese and Russian.

Saint retired in 1996. In 1998 she was made a Member of the Order of the British Empire for her services to literature. She and her husband lived in Chieveley near Newbury in Berkshire.

Her husband died in 2004. She died on 7 April 2012.

== Influences and legacy ==
One of the writers who influenced Saint was Jane Austen. Saint's work also bears some similarities to the social comedies of manners written in the 1920s and 1930s and to the work of Barbara Pym.

Miss Read's work has in turn influenced a number of writers, including American writer Jan Karon. The musician Enya has a track on her Watermark album named after Saint's book Miss Clare Remembers, and one on her Shepherd Moons album titled No Holly for Miss Quinn.

== Bibliography ==
The Fairacre novels:

- Village School* – 1955
- Village Diary* – 1957
- Storm in the Village* – 1958
- Miss Clare Remembers – 1962
- Over the Gate – 1964
- Village Christmas** – 1966
- Fairacre Festival – 1968
- Emily Davis – 1971
- Tyler's Row – 1972
- Christmas Mouse** – 1973
- Farther Afield – 1974
- No Holly for Miss Quinn** – 1976
- Village Affairs – 1977
- The White Robin – 1979
- Village Centenary – 1980
- Summer at Fairacre – 1984
- Mrs. Pringle – 1989
- Changes at Fairacre – 1991
- Farewell to Fairacre – 1993
- A Peaceful Retirement – 1996

The first three books (marked with *) have been published in a single volume, Chronicles of Fairacre. The three Christmas books marked with ** have been published together.

- The Market Square (1966) and The Howards of Caxley (1967) are set in the historical past of Caxley, the nearby market town to Fairacre where Fairacre people go from time to time. Fairacre and Beech Green, a nearby village, are mentioned. The events in these books end before the events of the first Fairacre book start.

Thrush Green books:

- Thrush Green – 1959
- Winter in Thrush Green – 1961
- News from Thrush Green – 1970
- Battles at Thrush Green – 1975
- Return to Thrush Green – 1978
- Gossip from Thrush Green – 1981
- Affairs at Thrush Green – 1983
- At Home in Thrush Green – 1985
- School at Thrush Green – 1987
- Friends at Thrush Green – 1990
- Celebrations at Thrush Green – 1992
- Year at Thrush Green – 1995
- Christmas at Thrush Green – 2009 written with Jenny Dereham
- The World of Thrush Green – 1988. This book discusses the real place that inspired Thrush Green and has excerpts from all Thrush Green books published as of 1988.

Children's books:

- Hobby Horse Cottage – 1958
- The Little Red Bus – 1964
- The New Bed – 1964
- No Hat! – 1964
- Plum Pie – 1964
- Hob and the Horse Bat – 1965
- Cluck, the Little Black Hen – 1965
- The Little Peg Doll – 1965
- Tiggy – 1971. A non-fiction biography of one of the author's beloved cats.
- Animal Boy – 1975
- The Little Red Bus and Other Rhyming Stories - 1991 Omnibus containing The Little Red Bus, Cluck the Little Black Hen, Plum Pie, The Little Peg Doll, No Hat!, and The New Bed

Autobiography:

- A Fortunate Grandchild – 1982
- Time Remembered – 1986

These two were also published in an omnibus edition titled Early Days.

Other books she wrote:

- Fresh from the Country – 1960. The story of a young country girl who has taken a first teaching job in the big city.
- Tales from a Village School – 1994. Short stories.
- Miss Read's Country Cooking – 1969. ISBN 0-7181-0327-0
- Mrs Griffin Sends Her Love: and other writings - 2013. A selection of journalism, published posthumously.
