= Brian Cheesman =

English cricketer

Personal information
- Full name: Brian Eldon Frederick Cheesman
- Born: 14 June 1929 (age 97); Shefford Woodlands, Berkshire, England
- Batting: Right-handed
- Bowling: Right-arm off break

Domestic team information
- Years: Team
- 1963–1966: Berkshire

Career statistics
Competition	List A
Matches	3
Runs scored	60
Batting average	20.00
100s/50s	0/0
Top score	31
Balls bowled	96
Wickets	1
Bowling average	71.00
5 wickets in innings	0
10 wickets in match	0
Best bowling	1/37
Catches/stumpings	1/–
- Source: Cricinfo, 10 January 2010

Brian Eldon Frederick Cheesman (born 14 June 1929) is a former English cricketer, a right-handed batsman who bowled right-arm off break.

He made his debut for Berkshire in the 1963 Minor Counties Championship against Dorset. Also in 1963 he made a single appearance for the Surrey Second XI against the Warwickshire Second XI in the Second Eleven Championship.

In 1965 he made his List-A debut for the club in the 1965 Gillette Cup against Somerset, which Berkshire lost by five wickets. The following season he played two List-A matches in the 1966 Gillette Cup against Hertfordshire, where he scored his highest List-A score of 31. In the Second Round he made his final List-A appearance against Gloucestershire.

His final appearance for Berkshire was in the 1966 Minor Counties Championship against Oxfordshire. He represented Berkshire 37 times in the championship.
