= RAF Welford =

Royal Air Force station in England

RAF Welford ~~RAF Welford Park~~ ~~USAAF Station AAF-474~~
- Part of United States Air Forces in Europe – Air Forces Africa (USAFE)
- Near Welford, Berkshire in England
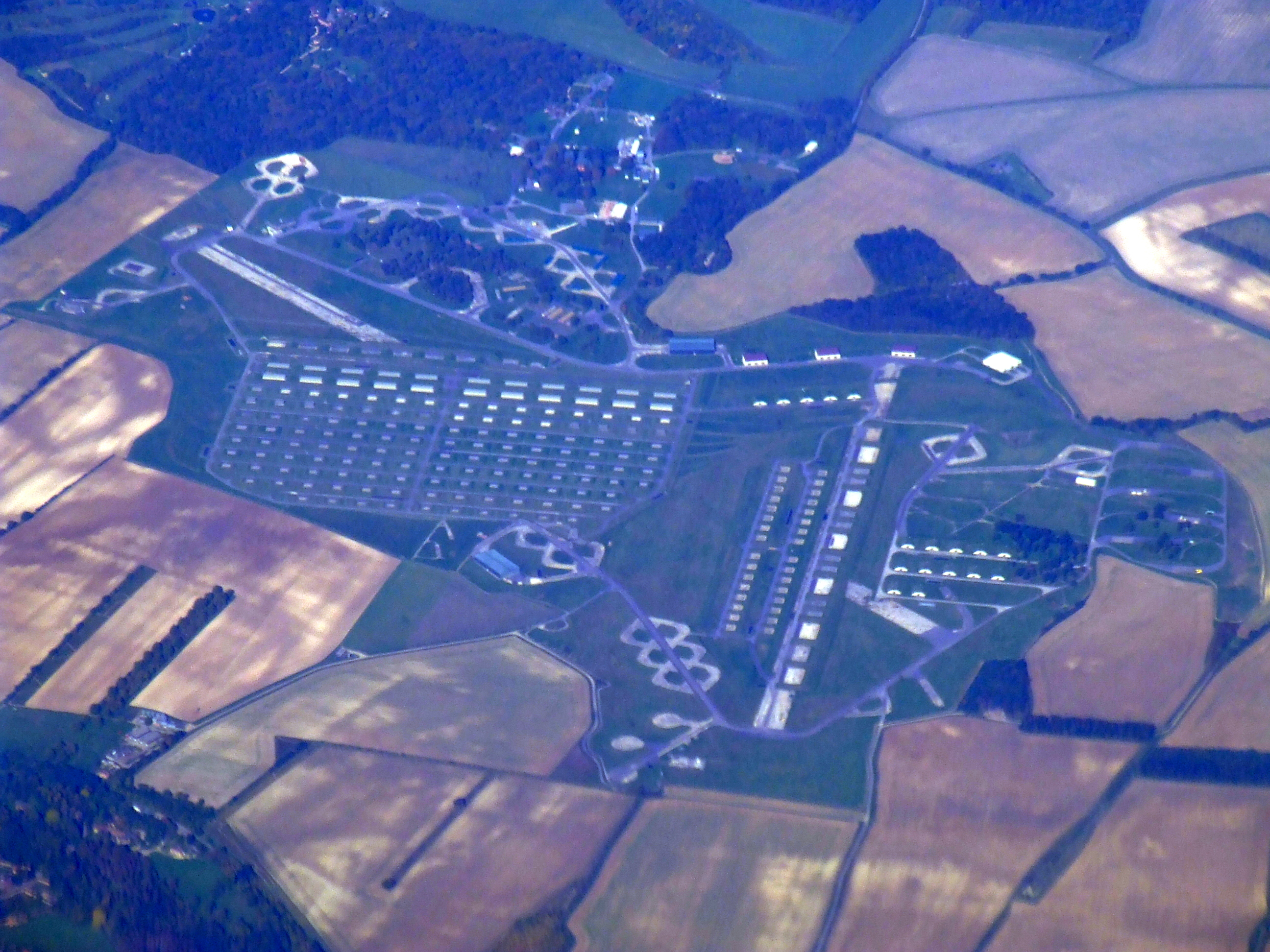
- RAF Welford

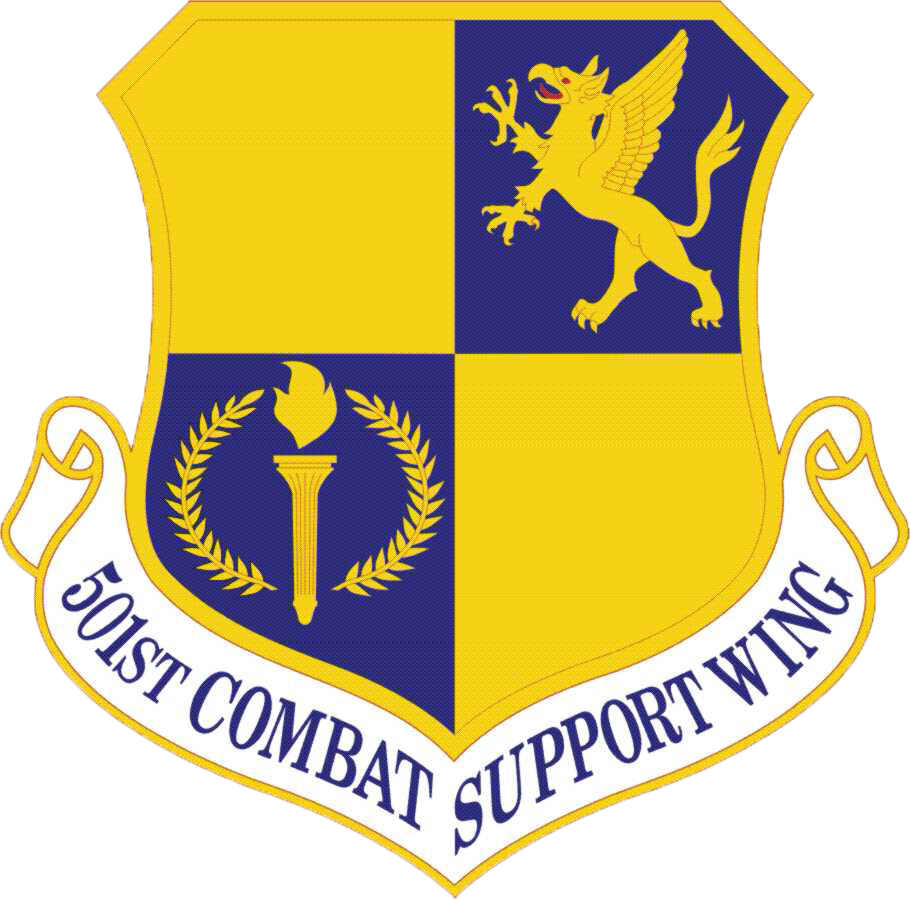

Site information
- Type: Royal Air Force station
- Code: WF
- Owner: Ministry of Defence
- Operator: Royal Air Force (1943,1945–1948,1995–present); United States Army Air Forces (1943–1945); United States Air Force (1955–present)

Location
- Shown within Berkshire RAF Welford (the United Kingdom)
- Coordinates: 51°28′06″N 001°24′13″W

Site history
- Built: 1943
- In use: 1943–1948, 1955–present

Garrison information
- Garrison: 420th Munitions Squadron

Airfield information
- Elevation: 147 metres (482 ft) AMSL
Runways
Direction	Length and surface
~~00/00~~	Asphalt
~~00/00~~	Asphalt
~~00/00~~	Asphalt

Royal Air Force Welford or more simply RAF Welford is an active Royal Air Force station in Berkshire, England. The station lies approximately 6 miles (10 km) northwest of Newbury, and about 50 miles (80 km) west of London.

Opened in 1943, it was used during the Second World War by both the Royal Air Force and United States Army Air Forces. During the war it was used primarily as a transport airfield. After the war it was closed in 1946 and placed in reserve status. As a result of the Cold War, the station was reopened in 1955 as a munitions depot by the United States Air Force.

Today it is one of the largest ammunition compounds for the United States Air Force in Western Europe for heavy munitions.

== Location ==
RAF Welford is in West Berkshire and has a dedicated but rarely used access road from the eastbound M4 motorway, halfway between junctions 13 (A34, Newbury) and 14 (A338, Hungerford). The access road from the M4 is signposted "Works Unit Only", and until 2015 the 1-mile marker sign had the distinctive red border of a defence establishment.

== History ==
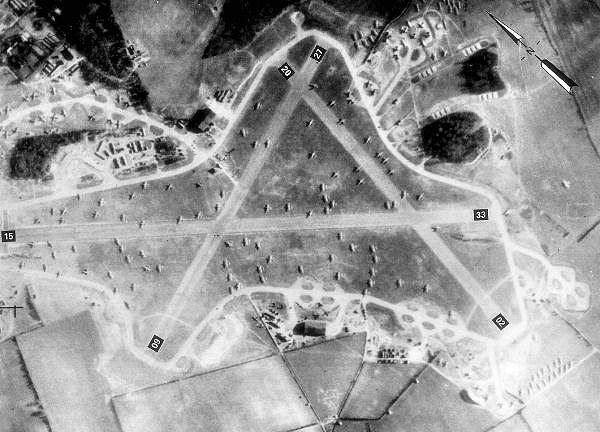
RAF Welford, May 1944. The CG-4 gliders and C-47s of the 435th Troop Carrier Group are parked wherever space can be found, one month before the D-Day invasion of France.

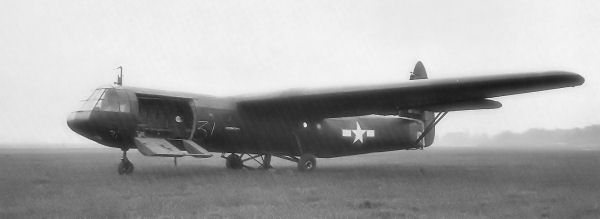
Horsa glider at Welford, May 1944

=== USAAF use ===
In October 1943 the airfield was allocated to Ninth Air Force IX Troop Carrier Command (TCC). While under USAAF control, Welford was known as USAAF Station AAF-474.

==== 315th Troop Carrier Group ====
The 315th Troop Carrier Group arrived at Welford on 6 November 1943 from RAF Aldermaston flying Douglas C-47 Skytrain and Douglas C-53 Skytroopers. Its squadrons and fuselage codes were:

- 34th Troop Carrier Squadron (NM)
- 43d Troop Carrier Squadron (UA)
- 309th Troop Carrier Squadron (M6)
- 310th Troop Carrier Squadron (4A)

The 315th TCG was part of the 52nd Troop Carrier Wing. On 7 February 1944 the group was transferred to RAF Spanhoe.

==== 435th Troop Carrier Group ====
As part of the IX Troop Carrier Command's desire to have its C-47 groups commence training with paratroops of the 101st Airborne Division deployed in the Salisbury Plain area, the squadrons of the 435th Troop Carrier Group arrived at Welford on 25 January 1944 from RAF Langar flying C-47s and C-53s. Its squadrons and fuselage codes were:

- 75th Troop Carrier Squadron (SH)
- 76th Troop Carrier Squadron (CW)
- 77th Troop Carrier Squadron (IB)
- 78th Troop Carrier Squadron (CM)

The 435th TCG was assigned to the 53d Troop Carrier Wing. In early February 1945 the group was moved to an Advanced Landing Ground at Breigny, France (A-48).

=== USAF ammunition store use ===
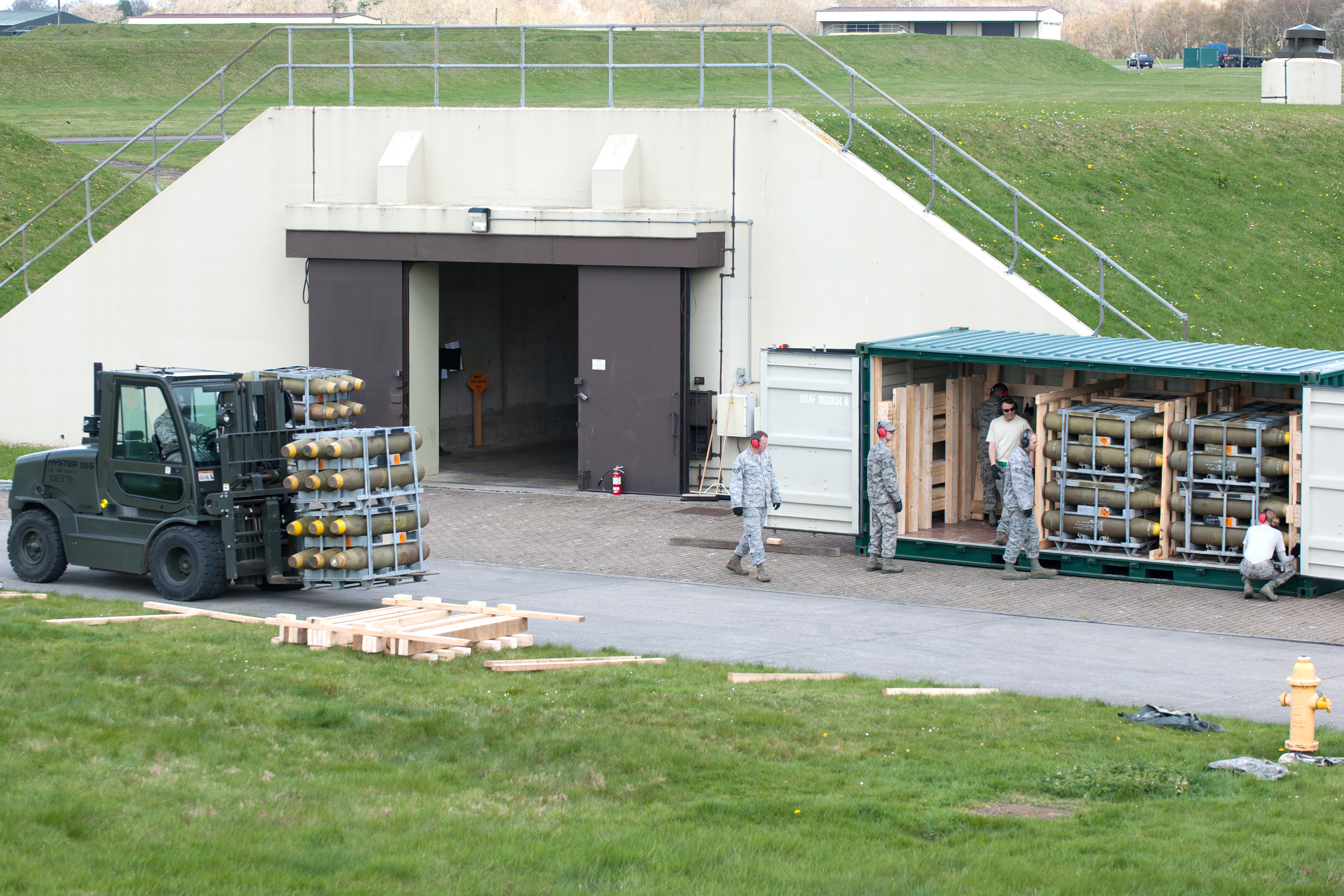
USAF munitions being loaded into a container in 2012

After being placed on a care and maintenance basis after the war, the station re-opened as the home of the 7531st Ammunition Squadron in September 1955. At the same time a short rail spur was opened, connecting the site with transfer sidings near Welford Park station on the Lambourn Valley Railway; the USAF used the line until the 1970s, and the track was lifted sometime after 1973.

During April 1995 the base was handed back to the RAF, only for it to be returned to USAF control. In 2009, USAF staffing at Welford was reduced as part of USAF-wide budgetary adjustments. The munitions base is described as "at its busiest when the US government deploys bombers to a forward air station at RAF Fairford". The bombers at RAF Fairford can include B-1, B-2 and B-52.

In May 2019, the USAF moved 450,000 pounds (200 tonnes) of explosives to RAF Welford, then the second-largest ammunition store in United States Air Forces in Europe – Air Forces Africa (USAFE).

== The crash of Lancaster DV290 ==
On 31 March 1944, at 5.00am a Avro Lancaster DV290, after returning from a flight to Nuremberg, Germany as part of an Airborne Cigar (ABC) electronic countermeasure mission, crashed on the airfield killing all eight occupants. A report says, "on their way back to Welford Airfield and having not responded to any air traffic controller's calls, [they] were considered the enemy. The runway lights were turned off and in the darkness the plane crashed on landing killing all on board". The aircraft had also sustained, "severe battle damage". The crew of this aircraft included an eighth airman – a German-speaking radio-operator – who broadcast radio interference matching the German night-fighter radio frequencies and also transmitted messages to send the fighters in different directions to clear a path for the Lancaster bombers. An annual memorial service is held at the airbase to remember those airmen.

== Based units ==
Welford is now under the command of the 420th Munitions Squadron, and comes under the command of the 501st Combat Support Wing, with headquarters at RAF Fairford, which provides support to the Geographically Separated Units (GSUs) in the United Kingdom.

== See also ==
- List of Royal Air Force stations
