= Francis Castilion =

16th-century English politician

Francis Castilion (1561–1638) was the member of the Parliament of England for Great Bedwyn for the parliament of 1597.

His father, Giovanni Battista Castiglione, had been an Italian tutor and later a groom of the privy chamber to Queen Elizabeth.
