= Welford Park =

Country house in Berkshire, England

Coordinates: 51°27′21.45″N 1°24′48.87″W

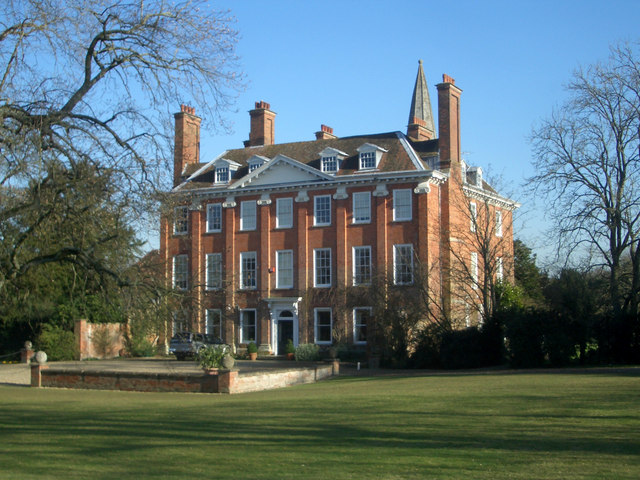

- Location within Berkshire

General information
- Location: Welford, Berkshire
- Year built: c. 1652
- Owner: James Puxley

Design and construction
- Architects: John Jackson of Oxford; Thomas Archer
- Known for: Filming site of The Great British Bake Off (2014-2019, 2022-)

Welford Park is a country house and estate in the village of Welford in the English county of Berkshire, situated 5.2 miles northwest of Newbury and 10.9 miles south of Wantage. It is a Grade I-listed building.

The church of Welford St Gregory, one of only two existing round-tower churches in Berkshire, is located adjacent to the house. The various chalk streams that make up the River Lambourn flow through the grounds.

The estate opens its grounds to the public every year for about four weeks to enable visitors to see the carpets of snowdrops that line the riverbanks and flow through the nearby woods.

== History ==
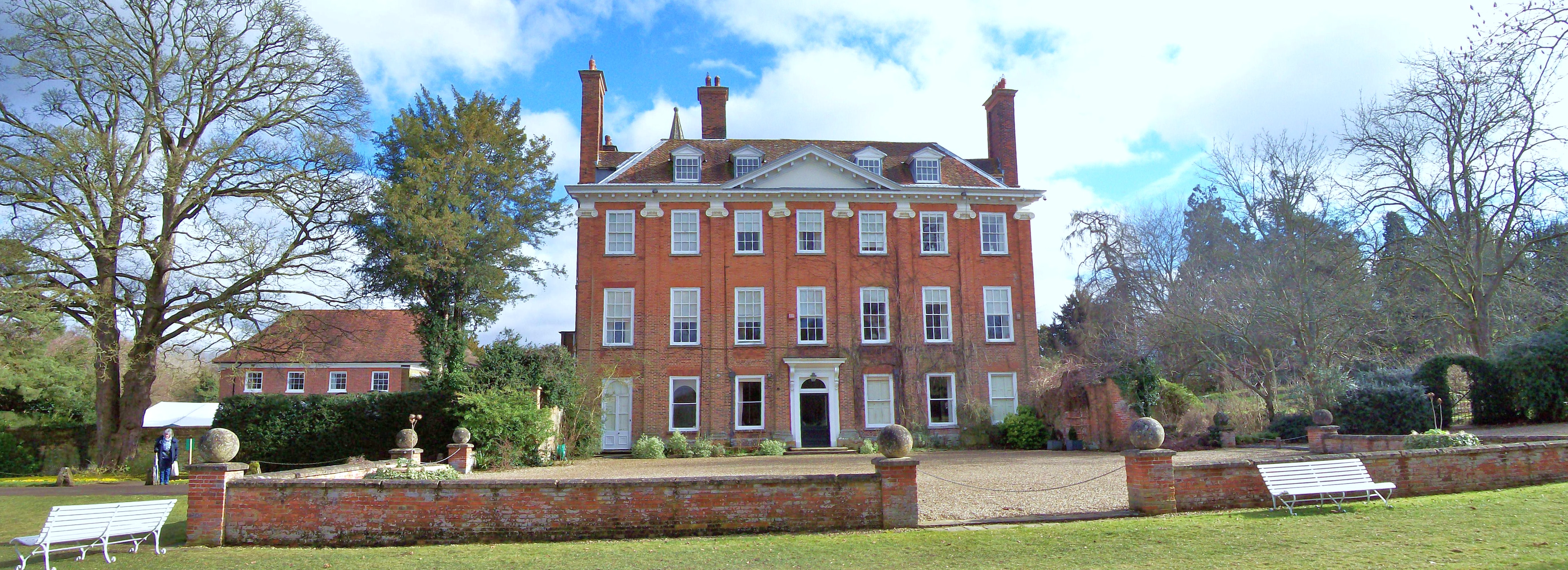
Welford Park House

Welford Park is built on the site of a monastic grange that belonged to Abingdon Abbey from Anglo-Saxon times. After the dissolution of the monasteries, King Henry VIII used the site as a hunting lodge. Later it was granted to Sir Thomas Parry by Queen Elizabeth I. It was his main residence, but his son moved the family to Hamstead Marshall. Welford was then used as a dower house for his mother, who is buried in the adjoining church.

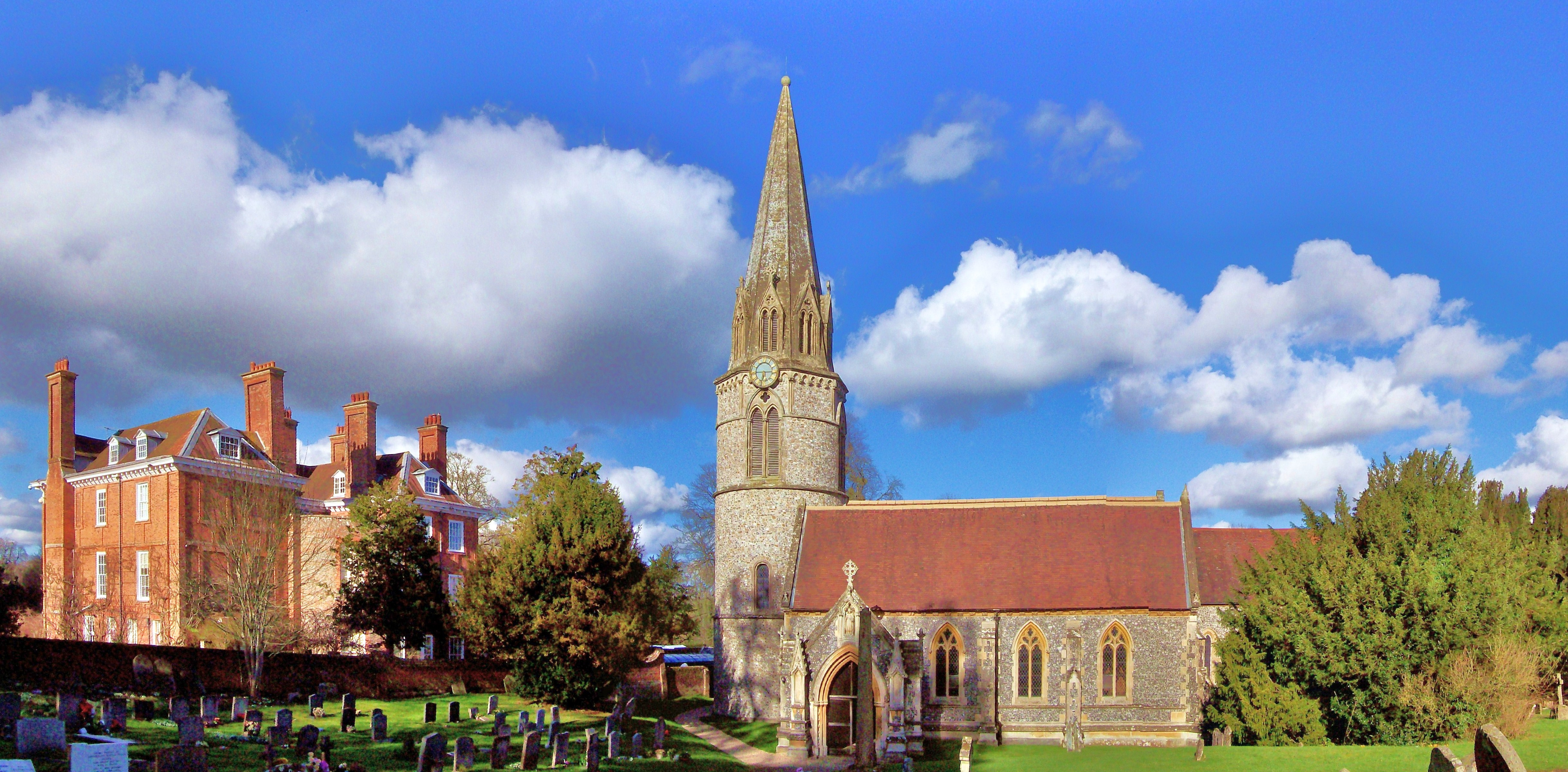
The rear of Welford Park House, with the church of Welford St. Gregory

The existing house dates from about 1652 and was built by John Jackson of Oxford for Richard Jones, the grandson of Sir Francis Jones, Lord Mayor of London in 1620, who had purchased the property in 1618. Jones died with no male heir and his daughter Mary in 1680 married John Archer, son of John Archer of Coopersale House, Essex and his wife Eleanor (Curzon), daughter of Sir John Curson, Baronet of Kedleston, Derbyshire. Welford Park was remodelled by their son-in-law, the architect Thomas Archer (no relation), about 1700, which resulted in an additional storey and a facade decorated with ionic columns. The interior was again altered in 1840.

The property then passed in 1706 by marriage to William Eyre, on condition he changed his name to Archer and subsequently (in 1800) to the MP, John Houblon, who also changed his name, to John Archer-Houblon. It then passed to his younger son, Charles, who re-adopted the surname Eyre. In 1891 the house was let to tenants and during the First World War used as a convalescent home. It later (1954) passed by marriage to John Puxley.

The house remains in the ownership of his son James Puxley, a local landowner, former High Sheriff of Berkshire, and former Lord Lieutenant of Berkshire.

The estate was the taping site of The Great British Bake Off between 2014 and 2019, with production for the 2020 and 2021 seasons moving to Down Hall to accommodate changes related to the COVID-19 pandemic. In 2022, The Great British Bake Off returned to the estate for its 13th series.

== Snowdrops ==
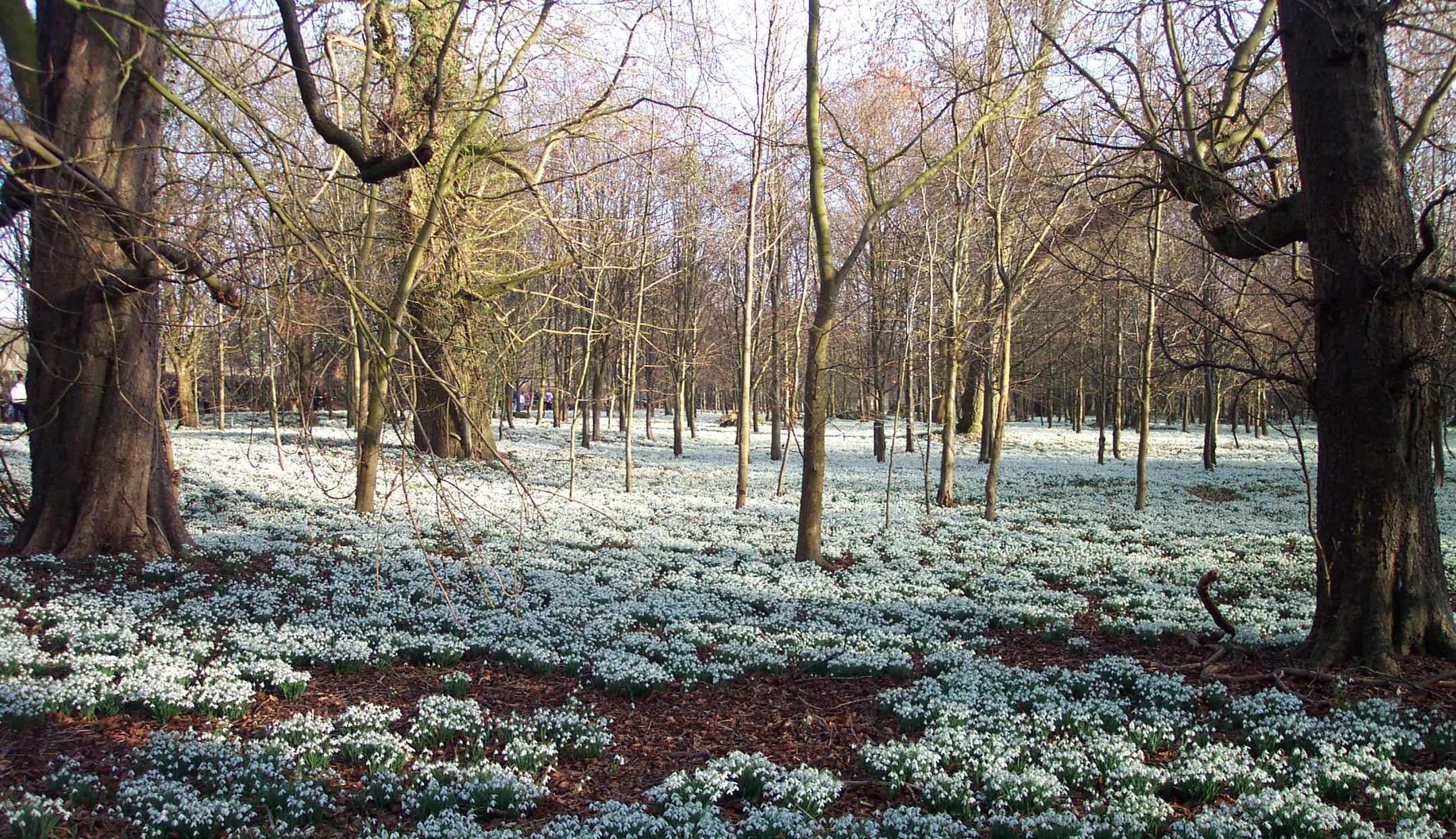
The snowdrop display in 2007

Welford Park is a private residence, and for most of the year neither it nor its grounds are open to the public. However, in a tradition that is now over 50 years old, the grounds are opened to enable visitors to view the year's bloom of snowdrops and, to a lesser extent, aconites. The flowers thrive on the chalky soil, forming a white carpet across the estate's riverside beech woodland.
