= Lambourn railway station =

Former railway station in Lambourn, Berkshire, England

Lambourn
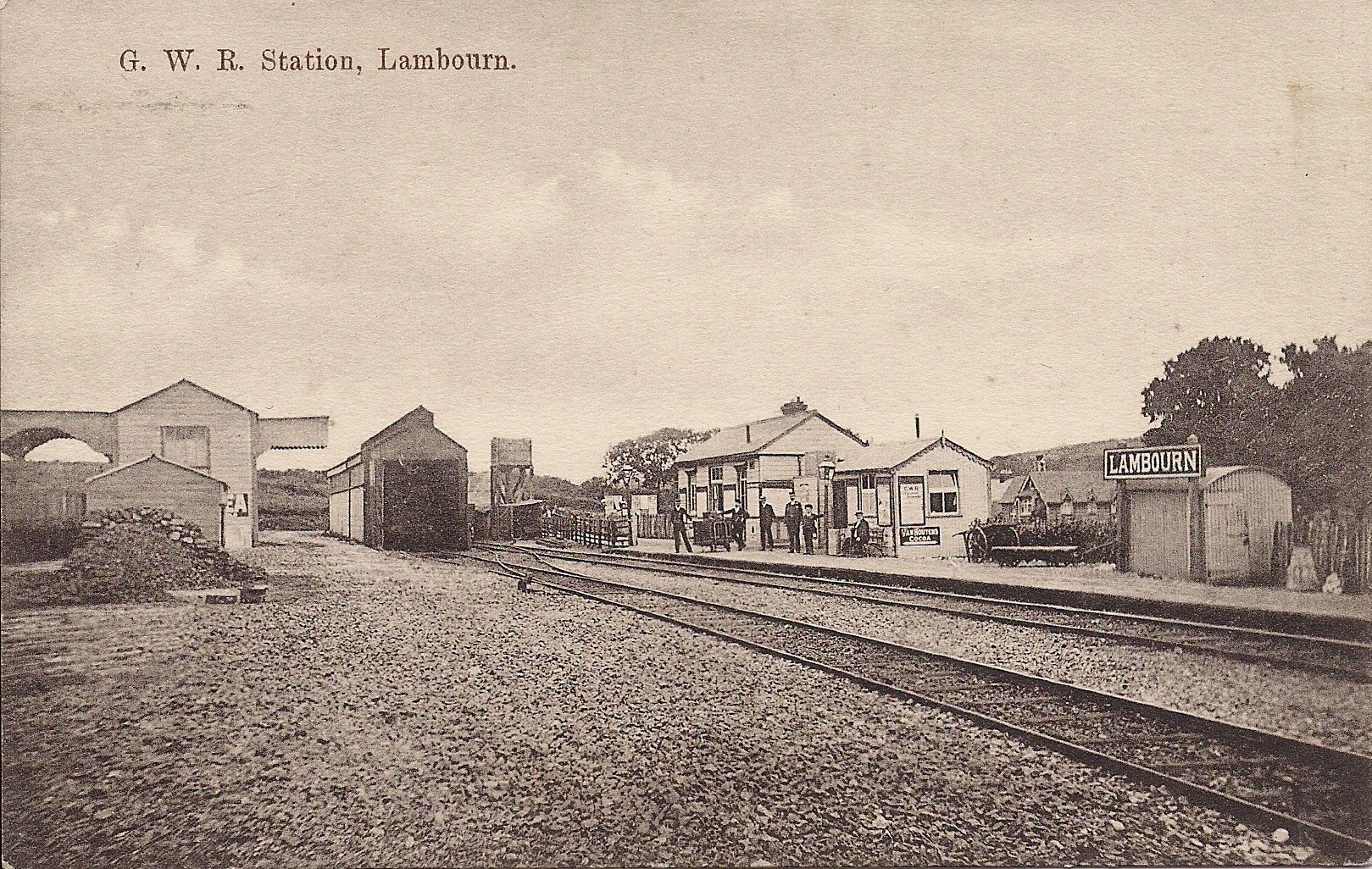

General information
- Location: Lambourn, Berkshire; England
- Coordinates: 51.5049°N 1.5295°W
- Grid reference: SU327785
- Platforms: 1

Other information
- Status: Disused

History
- Original company: Lambourn Valley Railway
- Pre-grouping: Great Western Railway
- Post-grouping: Great Western Railway

Key dates
- 1898: Opened
- 1960: Closed
Location

Lambourn railway station was a railway station in Lambourn, Berkshire, England, on the Lambourn Valley Railway.

== History ==
The station opened on 4 April 1898. It was the terminus and the most substantial station on the line. Currently, a street named "The Old Station Yard" runs through the now demolished site.

=== Goods traffic ===
Lambourn had an office and extensive freight facilities, including a goods yard with a loading dock, goods shed, locomotive shed, a coal yard and office, and cattle pens. The station was also busy with racehorses, with traffic peaking between 1920 and 1935.

=== Closure ===
The station closed to all traffic on 4 January 1960.

Preceding station	Disused railways	Following station
Eastbury Halt	Great Western Railway; Lambourn Valley Railway	Terminus
