= Woodspeen =

Coordinates: 51.420687°N 1.362538°W

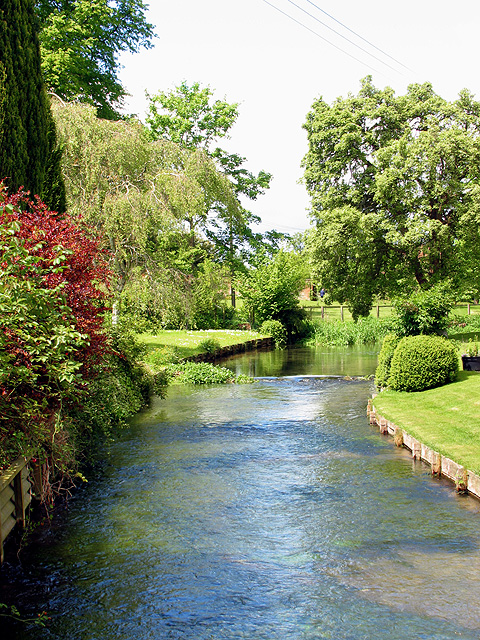
- The River Lambourn at Woodspeen

- Location within Berkshire
- OS grid reference: SU446693
- Metropolitan borough: West Berkshire
- Metropolitan county: Berkshire
- Region: South East
- Country: England
- Sovereign state: United Kingdom
- Post town: NEWBURY
- Postcode district: RG14
- Dialling code: 01635
- Police: Thames Valley
- Fire: Royal Berkshire
- Ambulance: South Central
- UK Parliament: Berkshire

Woodspeen is a hamlet in Berkshire, England, and part of the civil parish of Speen. The settlement lies near to the A34 road (Newbury Bypass), and is located approximately 2.5 miles (4.0 km) north-west of Newbury. It is near the Newbury suburb of Speen. Woodspeen is a river side settlement.
