= Westfield Farm Chalk Bank =

Protected area in Berkshire, England

- Site of Special Scientific Interest
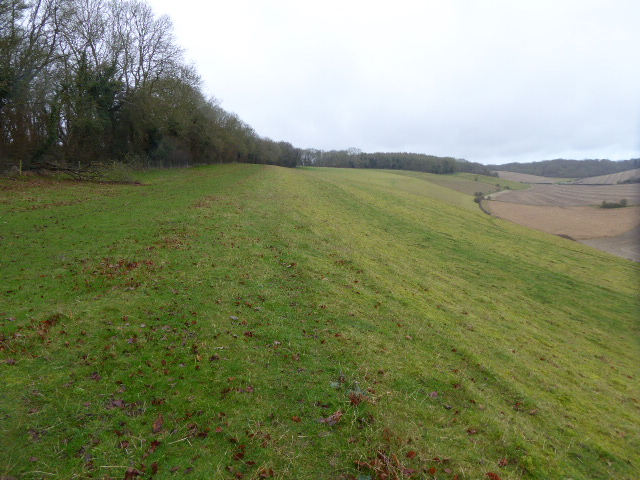

- Location within Berkshire
- Location of Westfield Farm Chalk Bank.
- Area of search: Berkshire
- Grid reference: SU 353 761
- Coordinates: 51.483°N 1.49°W
- Interest: Biological
- Area: 14.1 hectares (35 acres)
- Notification date: 1990
- Location map: Magic Map

Westfield Farm Chalk Bank is a 14.1-hectare (35-acre) biological Site of Special Scientific Interest west of East Garston in Berkshire.

== Geography ==
The site is lowland Calcareous grassland The bank is North facing. There is access by a footpath from Newbury Road.

== Flora ==
The site has the following Flora:

- Bromus erectus
- Brachypodium pinnatum
- Lolium perenne
- Cynosurus cristatus
- Scabiosa columbaria
- Linum catharticum
- Thymus praecox
- Cirsium acaule
- Carex flacca
- Gentianella amarella
- Knautia arvensis
- Primula veris
- Anthyllis vulneraria
- Galium verum
- Briza media
- Ononis repens
- Sanguisorba minor
- Plantago media
- Campanula glomerata
- Koeleria macrantha
- Trifolium medium
- Dactylorhiza fuchsii
- Listera ovata
- Anacamptis pyramidalis
- Coeloglossum viride
- Platanthera chlorantha
