= Francis Jones (Lord Mayor) =

English merchant

Sir Francis Jones (1559–1622) was an English merchant who was Lord Mayor of London in 1620.

== Career ==
Jones was a city of London merchant and a member of the Worshipful Company of Haberdashers. On 18 July 1610, he was elected an alderman of the City of London for Aldgate ward. He was Sheriff of London for the period 1610 to 1611, and also Master of the Haberdashers Company from 1610 to 1611. He was Master of the Haberdashers again for 1613 to 1614 and for 1616 to 1617. He was knighted on 12 March 1617. In 1620 he was elected Lord Mayor of London and was Master of the Haberdashers Company again for 1620 to 1621.

For his inauguration as Lord Mayor in 1620, the Haberdashers Company commissioned The Triumphs of Peace from John Squire (died 1653), vicar of St Leonard's, Shoreditch. The show included five pageants in the city.

== Family ==
Sir Francis was the son of John Jones of Cleverley in Shropshire. He married twice and had three sons and a daughter by his first wife. They lived in London and at his country estate at Welford Park in Berkshire, which he bought in 1618 from the Parry family.

Civic offices
Preceded by Sir William Cockayne	Lord Mayor of the City of London; 1620	Succeeded by Edward Barkham
