= Halfway, Berkshire =

Coordinates: 51°24.8′N 1°25′W

Halfway
- Village
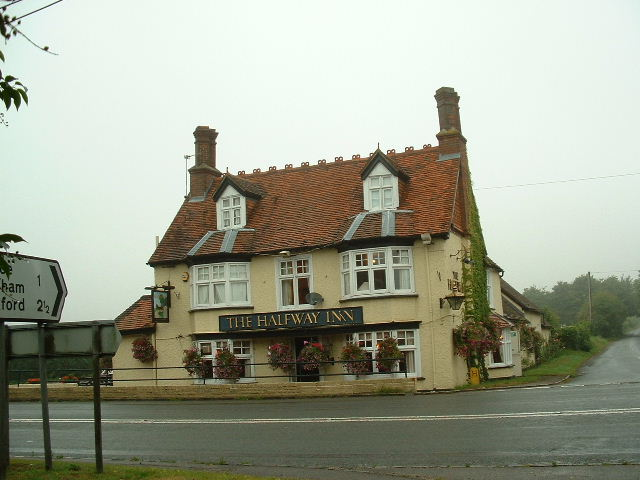
- Halfway Inn

- Location within Berkshire
- OS grid reference: SU407684
- Civil parish: Welford
- Unitary authority: West Berkshire
- Ceremonial county: Berkshire
- Region: South East
- Country: England
- Sovereign state: United Kingdom
- Post town: Newbury
- Postcode district: RG20
- Dialling code: 01488
- Police: Thames Valley
- Fire: Royal Berkshire
- Ambulance: South Central
- UK Parliament: Newbury

Halfway is a village in the civil parish of Welford in the English county of Berkshire. It is located in the district of West Berkshire and the Newbury parliamentary constituency. It is called Halfway because it is situated half-way between London and Bristol on the old Bath Road.

== Notable buildings ==
It used to be the site of a folly, in the shape of a mock castle, which was demolished in the 1960s. The Halfway Inn is a former coaching inn and has had various names in the past, including The Green Man.
