= Shefford Woodlands =

Coordinates: 51.4564°N 1.4748°W

- Village
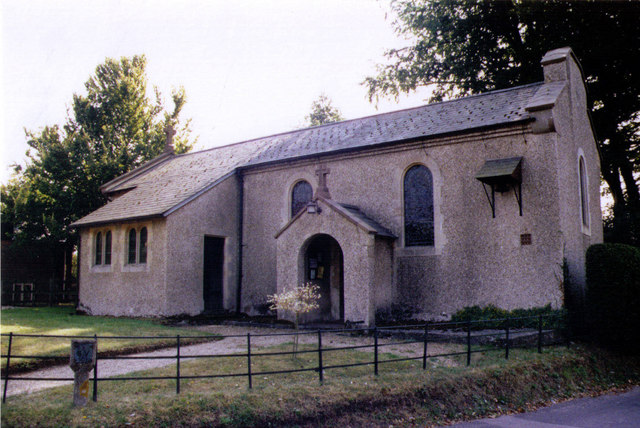
- St Stephen's church

- Location within Berkshire
- OS grid reference: SU3673
- Civil parish: Great Shefford
- Unitary authority: West Berkshire
- Ceremonial county: Berkshire
- Region: South East
- Country: England
- Sovereign state: United Kingdom
- Post town: Newbury
- Postcode district: RG17
- Dialling code: 01488
- Police: Thames Valley
- Fire: Royal Berkshire
- Ambulance: South Central
- UK Parliament: Newbury
- Website: Great Shefford and Shefford Woodlands

Shefford Woodlands is a village in West Berkshire, England, about 3 miles (5 km) northeast of the market town of Hungerford. The village is in the civil parish of Great Shefford, about 1 mile (1.6 km) southeast of Great Shefford village. Shefford Woodlands is about 545 feet (166 m) above sea level in the Berkshire Downs, and just north of Junction 14 on the M4.

== History ==
Shefford Woodlands developed where the road linking Hungerford and Wantage (later a turnpike, now the A338) crossed the Roman road of Ermin Way linking Silchester and Gloucester. Woodlands House and the barn next to White House were built in the 18th century. The barn is a timber-framed building, originally of six bays, and enlarged in the 19th century. Both are now Grade II listed buildings. In the 19th and 20th centuries there were significant Wesleyan and Primitive Methodist congregations in Great Shefford parish, and Shefford Woodlands had a Methodist chapel. It fell into disuse, but then in 1911 was consecrated as the Church of England church of St Stephen, making it a dependent chapelry of the parish of St Mary, Great Shefford. Sunday services at St Stephen's are held once a month. The church is a Grade II listed building.

== Amenities ==
The Pheasant Inn and a childcare centre are just outside the village.

== Notable people ==
- Dora Saint (Miss Read) (1913-2012), author of the Miss Read novels.
