= Marsh Benham =

Village in Berkshire, England

Coordinates: 51.404°N 1.384°W

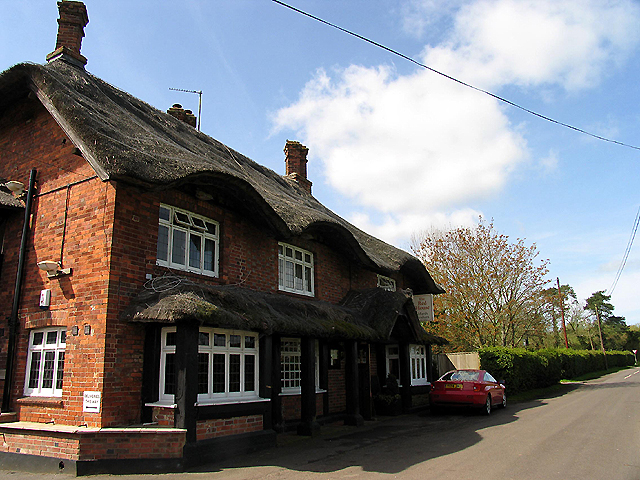
The Red House

Marsh Benham is a village in the civil parish of Speen in the county of Berkshire, England. It is situated in the unitary authority of West Berkshire, just west of Newbury.

== Amenities ==
The village has a public house called the 'Red House'. Nearby stands Benham Park.
