= Lambourn Valley Railway =

Abandoned railway from Newbury to Lambourn in England

Overview
- Status: Dismantled
- Termini: Newbury; Lambourn
- Stations: 9

Service
- Type: Heavy rail
- Operator(s): Lambourn Valley Railway; Great Western Railway; Western Region of British Railways

History
- Opened: 1898
- Closed: Passengers 1960; Goods 1973

Technical
- Line length: 12 1/2 miles (20.1 km)
- Num of tracks: Single track
- Track gauge: 4 ft 8 1/2 in (1,435 mm) standard gauge

The Lambourn Valley Railway (LVR) was a branch railway line in England, running from the town of Newbury, Berkshire, north-west to the civil parish of Lambourn. It was opened in 1898. Fulfilling a local need, it was in financial difficulties throughout its independent life and was sold to the Great Western Railway (GWR) in 1905.

Steam railmotors and a GWR diesel railcar were used on the line, as well as steam engines owned by the Lambourn valley Railway, and Great Western Railway standard engines.

The line closed to passenger traffic in 1960, but a section between Newbury and Welford remained open for freight traffic to RAF Welford until 1972. A special passenger service operated on 3 November 1973 between Newbury and Welford Park to give the public a final trip over the line; a nine-coach train made four runs in each direction, and a special souvenir booklet was produced.

== Origins ==
=== A horse tramway scheme ===
Lambourn had been an important agricultural and trading centre, but in the second half of the nineteenth century it was declining. Interested parties suggested a number of ways of making a railway connection, seen as important to revitalising the town, but it was left to the Engineer of the newly authorised Didcot, Newbury and Southampton Railway, E. E. Allen, to propose a realistic scheme. This was a tramway from Newbury to Lambourn; the Tramways Act 1870 (33 & 34 Vict. c. 78) had enabled a low-cost form of railway to be constructed without some of the legal processes required for conventional railways.

There was considerable local enthusiasm for the scheme and the provisional Newbury and Lambourn Tramway Company was formed in late 1873. A 3 ft gauge single track would be laid at the side of the main road, with several short branches within Newbury. It was to be horse-drawn, the vehicle making two round trips daily at first. The cost was estimated at £30,000 and it was authorised by the Newbury and Lamborne Tramway Order 1874 confirmed by the Tramways Orders Confirmation Act 1874 (37 & 38 Vict. c. clxxxiii) on 7 August 1874; one year was allowed for construction. A contract for construction was let and a first rail was ceremonially fixed; the subscribers did not come forward and only shares to the value of £4,000 were taken up. The company could not proceed and at the expiry of the year allowed, it was wound up. (Note: It appears that two miles of track were laid; Cheap Street and Donnington Square are mentioned in Robertson and Simmonds, page 2; on the same page those authors give a diagram of the tramway track showing Seaton rails flush with a Tarmacadam road surface; the rails are seated on arris timbers but with no additional base timber. (Seaton rails have an inverted Y-shaped lower part, designed to sit astride the angle of the timbers.))

=== Not quite a light railway ===
Lambourn Valley Railway Act 1883
- Act of Parliament
- Parliament of the United Kingdom
- Long title: An Act for making a Railway to be called "The Lambourn Valley Railway," and for other purposes.
- Citation: 46 & 47 Vict. c. clxxvi

Dates
- Royal assent: 2 August 1883

Text of statute as originally enacted

This was followed by a more conventional railway scheme taking advantage of the Regulation of Railways Act 1868 which, among other things, authorised the construction of a light railway—the first use of the term—subject to conditions that might be imposed by the board of Trade. An attempt to get an authorising act of Parliament failed in the 1881 session due to objections over level crossings, but a revised scheme with a shorter route and fewer level crossings was submitted for the 1883 session, and obtained its authorising act of Parliament, the Lambourn Valley Railway Act 1883 (46 & 47 Vict. c. clxxvi) on 2 August 1883. The Lambourn Valley Railway Company was incorporated, with capital of £100,000. It was to be a single line built on the standard gauge; the estimated cost of the infrastructure was £80,530; it was authorised as an ordinary railway, not a light railway. (Note: Notwithstanding the directors' initial intentions for that. See Col Yorke's remarks in May 1904. Several authors (Bosley 1990, Fenton 1992, Monckton 1911, Kidner 1947) have implied light railway status or even named it erroneously The Lambourn Valley Light Railway. This may arise from the failed attempt to obtain a Light Railway Order in 1902.) The engineer was John Fowler.

Actually raising the capital was now the task; the directors offered a guaranteed dividend of 5% during the construction period, money that could only be paid out of capital. They also employed a new engineer, H. O. Baldry, who produced a reduced estimate for the construction of £58,068. However, by January 1885 only £23,365 had been subscribed.

In this impasse, the company acquired another engineer, William Gregory, and a new contractor, Jonathan Edwin Billups, who it seems (Note: Uncertainty expressed by Robertson and Simmonds.) was prepared to undertake the work for £110,000, but he would accept £60,000 of that in shares and £33,000 in debenture stock, only requiring £18,000 in cash. As a means of actually starting construction, this was attractive to the board, although by now they had not even the £18,000: of the £25,930 subscribed £10,000 had been spent on parliamentary costs—an extension of time had been applied for and granted—and land acquisition, and a further £10,000 was considered to be committed. Nonetheless, Billups was asked to start work, which he did on 18 June 1888.

=== Construction ===
Lambourn Valley Railway Act 1892
- Act of Parliament
- Parliament of the United Kingdom
- Long title: An Act to revive and extend the time for completing and opening the Lambourn Valley Railway and for other purposes.
- Citation: 55 & 56 Vict. c. clxiv

Dates
- Royal assent: 27 June 1892

The actual construction work proceeded satisfactorily until in June 1890, when about two-thirds of the line was ballasted, a serious contractual dispute with Billups arose. The company went to litigation against him and won, and were awarded costs. Billups left the scene, leaving behind his plant and a construction locomotive Lambourn. The company now decided to progress the works directly, but with almost no money this was a challenge, and no progress was made. Authorisation for a further extension of time and further borrowing were given in the Lambourn Valley Railway Act 1892 (55 & 56 Vict. c. clxiv), and the company approached the Great Western Railway (GWR) for help; the larger company was sympathetic but unwilling to lend the money.

A further extension of time was obtained, and a working agreement with the GWR was concluded, but no progress on the ground took place until the contractor S Pearson & Son of Westminster offered to complete the work for £33,000. A contract was agreed on 30 January 1897. It is not clear how Pearson expected to be paid the money.

Pearson discovered that he had to rework much of the earlier construction, including excavating 60,000 cu yd of spoil in supposedly finished cuttings, and piling the River Kennet bridge and rectifying problems on several other bridges.

Notwithstanding these additional tasks, Pearson & Son completed the work promptly and all that remained was a contract for the actual connection with the GWR at Newbury, also done by Pearson & Son but as contractor to the GWR.

Before opening to passengers, an inspection by the Board of trade inspector was required; Col. Yorke visited on 31 March 1898. His report is entirely descriptive without any adverse remarks, and he approved the opening. A coal train (not needing the official approval) may have run the following day, but the line opened fully to passengers and goods on 4 April 1898.

== Operating at last ==
So the railway opened, with the GWR operating. That company provided engine power—the 2-4-0T (Note: Robertson and Simmonds (page 13) say 0-6-0T, but Reed says it was a 2-4-0T and this is confirmed by photographs in Robertson and Simmond.) no 1384 at first—but coaching stock was not available, and the company chairman, Col. Archer-Houblon personally purchased four four-wheeled coaches from the Lincoln Wagon and Engine Company; he made them available to the company on a hire-purchase arrangement, the coaches carrying a plate indicating his ownership in the meantime. Eighteen goods wagons were procured on the same basis. Archer-Houblon had already made loans for some road-surfacing and other works.

The public timetable showed four trains each way daily, with five on Thursdays and Saturdays. A timetable bill shows connections to Liverpool and Manchester over the "D N S Ry" (i.e. the Didcot, Newbury and Southampton Railway, usually abbreviated to DNS) to Didcot and thence the GWR.

The traffic manager of the company was W. H. H. M. Gipps; he had been appointed some time before opening, and he was the only senior official in the company with practical railway experience, as he was also traffic manager of the Didcot, Newbury and Southampton Railway (DNS). Gipps promoted excursions from the Lambourn line to Southampton over the DNS. He had long urged the company to acquire its own locomotives and work the line itself, and Archer-Houblon once again provided the cash on a personal basis, and two 0-6-0T locomotives were purchased from Chapman and Furneaux of Gateshead, for £1,330 each. The first, Aelfred, arrived on 15 October 1898 and started work on 18 October, and the second, Ealhswith a day or so later.

The financial results of the first year of operation showed an operating profit of £954, making 19.7% of turnover. This was quite healthy, except that £857 8s 9d was due to Archer-Houblon as part of the agreed hire-purchase arrangement for rolling stock.

In 1902 J. B. Squire was appointed as managing director of the company. Commissioned to investigate economies, he recommended reducing the train service by one train daily, enabling a single engine to operate the service. All the goods work would be done in mixed trains, and there were later complaints about the delay to passengers in shunting.

=== The search for economy ===
Continuing to look for ways to reduce cost, the company applied in November 1902 for a light railway order under the terms of the Light Railways Act 1896. It is not clear what benefit this was expected to give them, but a hearing was held on 31 July 1903 and the order was refused.

The locomotive Ealhswith required an overhaul, and a third locomotive was procured from the Hunslet Engine Company, paying by instalments.

In 1902 the GWR made an offer to purchase the line for £45,000. At this time the company had debts of over £27,000, but they rejected the offer outright, relying on optimistic ideas of improving income on the line and the directors' willingness to fund necessary outgoing s personally. The offer was repeated in 1904 with an offer of £50,000 but was again rejected.

Unabashed, the GWR now suggested that their new railmotors would be useful on the line; specially developed to reduce costs on lightly trafficked lines, these consisted of a passenger coach with a small steam engine incorporated at one end. The railmotors could haul one or two goods wagons or a trailer coach. The Board considered this to be an attractive idea, and applied to the Board of Trade on 3 May 1904 for sanction to operate them. This was necessary because the axle load of the railmotors, at 12 tons, exceeded the authorised rolling stock weights. (Note: The reason for this limitation is not clear; light railways had an 8 ton axle load limit on their stock, but the Lambourn Valley had not been authorised as a light railway.)

Col Yorke of the Board of Trade made an inspection on 7 May 1904, in which two railmotors were passed over the underbridges together; some brickwork repairs were pointed out, but the proposal was approved. Yorke made the comment that:

for all practical purposes the line is now a light railway, though neither of the clauses referring to the Lt. Rly Act of 1860 nor the Lt. Rly. Act of 1896 apply to it.

The railmotors were put into service on 15 May 1904, and the goods train was discontinued four weeks later; porters were also dispensed with at the intermediate stations. The company's locomotives and rolling stock were removed to Swindon and auctioned, and Archer-Houblon finally got his loan repaid.

The offer by the GWR to purchase the line was evidently still alive, and agreement was reached, for the sum of £50,000; they considered that £75,000 needed to be expended on the line to make it suitable for their purposes. The formal transfer took place on 1 July 1905.

In the final months of independent existence, the company found that the hired railmotors were giving trouble; this was traced to the very hard water at Lambourn which was adversely affecting the small boilers in them. Conventional rolling stock was substituted temporarily.

== Part of the Great Western Railway ==
The £75,000 to put the line into shape may have seemed a negotiating ploy, but the GWR soon launched into major upgrading work; within weeks the track was relaid; Lambourn station was extended and a new station at Newbury West Fields was opened on 1 October 1906. Better accommodation and standard-height platforms were provided at most of the intermediate stations; a modern telephone system was installed and the electric tablet system of signalling was installed, with an intermediate block post at Welford Park.

At this time the GWR was developing its automatic train control (ATC) system. When finalised, track equipment was provided at distant signals which gave an audible and visual indication in the engine cab of whether the distant signal was off or on. If it was on, and the driver failed to acknowledge a warning, the brakes were automatically applied. In the experimental stage on the Lambourn branch, the ATC was provided instead of distant signals; conceptually an early form of cab signalling.

In 1912 the GWR ran a Sunday passenger service, but this was discontinued in October 1914; other reductions in the train service were made during the First World War. A Sunday train was restored from January 1925, primarily for milk traffic.

In the years following 1918 the line became increasingly heavily used, milk, passengers and goods all flourishing.

Newbury racecourse had opened in 1905, and the area was a well-established centre for training and stud purposes and for bloodstock sales. This brought a large volume of traffic to the line, in most cases special trains. The horseboxes were fitted with dual brake systems, for operating into territory where the Westinghouse air brake was operating.

=== Declining revenues ===
In the mid-1930s competition from road transport became serious, and it affected all the lines' traffics. The GWR considered how economies might be made, and at length on 5 February 1937 an AEC diesel railcar, no 18 started operating on the branch. The railcar was capable of hauling a limited trailing load. If necessary this was a passenger coach; the station pilot at Newbury was used to shunt the trailing coach off the railcar on arrival at the bay platform there. The railcar was based at Reading, and Lambourn engine shed was closed. Competing bus services were attractive, and at this period the heavy racehorse traffic became largely transferred to road.

== Nationalisation ==
Following the Transport Act 1947 the main line railways of Great Britain passed into state ownership at the beginning of 1948: British Railways. While there were no immediate changes on the Lambourn line, the Sunday train was discontinued in September 1950; its primary function had been for milk, and this had reduced heavily in volume over the years. At the end of 1951 complete closure was considered, but due to "important developments" at Welford Park, the initiative was shelved.

Those important developments were the construction of a new branch line from Welford Park to an RAF station, RAF Welford; the site was to be converted for munitions storage, and was to be operated by the United States Air Force from July 1954. The line was over two miles long, and was completed by October of the same year. Traffic to the base ran as required, and traffic returns suggest an average of about 100 movements per annum to 1960. The USAF used its own locomotives within the depot.

=== Closure ===
Steam haulage was reintroduced on the branch trains in 1956 but by this time revenue on the line was in serious decline, and closure was proposed. Goods services would continue to Welford Park, and the branch would remain open to that point for the USAF traffic. Some improvements were made there to the public goods facilities. The last passenger train ran on 4 January 1960.

The residual branch line was handed over to the USAF in 1970, but by June 1972 they had transferred the movements to road, saving them $100,000 per annum, and the line was closed completely; on Saturday 3 November 1973 a special passenger service was operated as a "farewell" event, and that was the end of the line.

== Topography ==
The Lambourn Valley line was a single line; the up direction was from Lambourn to Newbury.

The Lambourn Valley Railway ran from Newbury GWR station. At the time of construction the main line there was an east–west double track, and the station had two platforms. The Didcot Newbury and Southampton line (DNS) ran generally north to south: southbound DNS trains joined the GWR line at Greenham Junction (later Newbury East Junction) and ran east to west through Newbury station. They turned south again at Enborne Junction a little over a mile west of Newbury station. The Lambourn line had a dedicated bay platform at the west end of the station on the up side.

In the years 1906–1909 the station was considerably expanded, with central through lines; the platforms were served by loop lines and an additional bay was provided.

Leaving the station, the branch single track ran alongside the main line for half a mile and then turned north. Stations on the line were:

- Newbury West Fields Halt; opened 1 October 1906
- Speen; sometimes advertised as Speen for Donnington until about 1932
- Stockcross and Bagnor
- Boxford; also loop siding, accessed by ground frame
- Welford Park; originally also siding accessed by ground frame; in 1909 upgraded with a 312-foot passing loop and second platform, and block post provided; the USAF branch line left at the Newbury end of the station and turned north-east
- West Shefford; renamed Great Shefford in 1900; loop sidings accessed by ground frame
- East Garston; loop siding accessed by ground frame
- Eastbury
- Lambourn; terminus and block post; single platform with run round loop, engine shed and sidings.

The alignment on the branch was mainly straight with a number of local curves typically in the range 18 to 40 chains radius.

The line climbed steadily from Newbury with some gentle falls also. The stiffest climbs were from Newbury Fields to Speen, just over a mile at 1 in 75; and from East Garston to a summit just before Eastbury, about a mile at 1 in 100 average.

=== The line today ===
There are no plans for reopening the line. A long-distance footpath, the Lambourn Valley Way, uses the trackbed of the former railway in places.

== Rolling stock ==
=== Locomotives ===
From the opening of the line on 4 April 1898 until the delivery of the LVR's first locomotives in late 1898, the line was worked by a locomotive loaned from the GWR. This was their no. 1384, a small 2-4-0T which they had acquired from the Watlington and Princes Risborough Railway in 1883; it was built in 1876.

Altogether the LVR owned three locomotives:

- Aelfred Chapman and Furneaux 0-6-0T, built October 1898 (works no. 1162)
- Eahlswith Chapman and Furneaux 0-6-0T, built November 1898 (works no. 1161)
- Eadweade Hunslet Engine Company 0-6-0T, built June 1903 (works no. 811)

Although produced by two different manufacturers, the three were generally similar: they were outside cylinder 0-6-0T locomotives with 3-foot-7-inch (1,090 mm) wheels, but Eadweade was slightly larger than the others: its wheelbase was 10 feet 6 inches (3.20 m) and it weighed 24 long tons (24 t) as opposed to 9 ft 6 in (2.90 m) and 23.5 long tons (23.9 t) for the other two. Eahlswith and Aelfred were painted dark blue, lined out in black and white. Eadweade was painted similarly, but had a copper-capped chimney and a brass safety valve cover. Nameplates were brass, with red backgrounds.

On 15 May 1904, the LVR hired two steam railmotors from the GWR, and the locomotives were put up for sale. They were sold to the Cambrian Railways in June 1904, where Eadweade became no. 24, Ealhswith became no. 26, and Aelfred became no. 35. Under the Grouping, the Cambrian became a constituent of the enlarged GWR, and so these locomotives entered GWR stock on 1 January 1922. There, they became GWR nos. 819–821 in the order of their Cambrian numbers. Their ultimate fate varied: 820 (ex-Ealhswith) was withdrawn by the GWR in March 1930, and sold to a Somerset colliery in March 1931, from where it was sold for scrap in early 1945. 821 (ex-Aelfred) was withdrawn by the GWR in October 1932, sold to a Glamorgan colliery in May 1933; after working for another colliery, it was scrapped in 1942. No. 819 (ex-Eadweade) remained on the GWR, being withdrawn in March or April 1946, being scrapped in 1947.

The two hired steam railmotors were GWR nos. 1 & 2, which had been built in October 1903 for £3477-4-0d (equivalent to £365,548 in 2025) for the pair; the LVR hired them for £420 (equivalent to £44,150 in 2025) per year, again for the pair. They had an axle loading of 12 long tons (12.19 t), and since the line had been designed for a maximum axle load of 8 long tons (8.13 t), the bridges needed to be inspected with both railmotors upon them before they could be approved for use. When they were temporarily returned to the GWR for maintenance between October/November 1904 and January/February 1905, their replacements were nos. 19 & 21, which had been built in July/June 1904. In July 1905, one of the railmotors covered a duty which on Mondays to Saturdays began at 07:45 and ended at 19:52, covering 125 miles (201 km); it was supplemented on Thursdays and Saturdays by the other which began at 12:40 and finished work at 17:11, covering 52 miles (84 km). On Sundays just one railmotor was required, between 10:00 and 14:00. The highest speed attained by the railmotors was 23.1 miles per hour (37.2 km/h), with an average speed of 22.2 miles per hour (35.7 km/h). One railmotor could handle a tail load having not more than 28 wheels. After the GWR took over the line on 1 July 1905, the two railmotors remained a few weeks more, but were replaced by normal GWR locomotives and coaches from August/September 1905.

The GWR used, at various times, steam railmotors, diesel railcars and an ex-M&SWJR 2-4-0.

=== Coaches ===
For the opening of the line, four coaches were bought from Brown, Marshall & Co of Birmingham; they were paid for by Col. Archer Houblon, who sold them on to the LVR on a hire purchase basis. Two were composites, each carrying 8 first-class and 24 second-class passengers, as well as some luggage space; the other two seated 32 second-class. They had four wheels, and were 21 feet 7 inches (6.58 m) long, measured over the body. The body livery was plain wood, with gold lettering shaded red and black.

=== Wagons ===
Originally there were eighteen goods wagons; a brake van was acquired by April 1899. All of these were second-hand purchases. The livery for twelve of the wagons was dark brown, whilst six were slate grey.

On 24 November 1904, the remainder of the railway's rolling stock was sold by auction at the GWR's yard in Swindon. At this time, there were four composite coaches, a passenger van, fifteen goods wagons and a goods brake van. One of the coaches was bought by the Burry Port and Gwendraeth Valley Railway, and the other three went to the West Sussex Railway.

== See also ==
- Locomotives of the Great Western Railway
- The Lambourn Valley Railway website

== Sources ==
- Butt, R.V.J. (1995). The Directory of Railway Stations. Yeovil: Patrick Stephens Ltd. ISBN 1-85260-508-1. R508.
- Davies, F. K.; Firth, J. M.; Lucking, J. H.; Thomas, R. E.; Allcock, N. J.; Sterndale, A. C.; Barrie, D. S. M.; Reed, P. J. T.; Mountford, E. R. (April 1966). White, D. E. (ed.). The Locomotives of the Great Western Railway, part ten: Absorbed Engines, 1922–1947. RCTS. ISBN 0-901115-20-7.
- Lewis, John (2004). Great Western Steam Railmotors and their services. Didcot: Wild Swan. ISBN 1-874103-96-8.
- Reed, P. J. T. (December 1956). White, D. E. (ed.). The Locomotives of the Great Western Railway, part three: Absorbed Engines, 1854-1921. RCTS. ISBN 0-901115-33-9. OCLC 12654357.
- Robertson, Kevin; Simmonds, Roger (1984). An Illustrated History of the Lambourn Branch. Bucklebury: Wild Swan. ISBN 0-906867-24-X.
