= List of Sites of Special Scientific Interest in Berkshire =

List of Sites of Special Scientific Interest

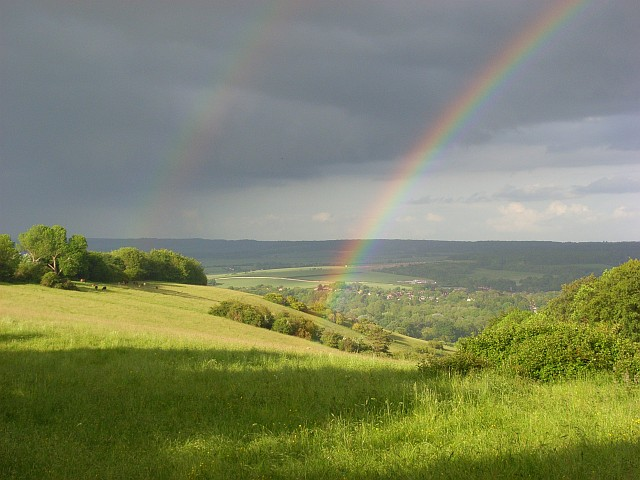
Lardon Chase

In England, Sites of Special Scientific Interest (SSSIs) are designated by Natural England, which is responsible for protecting England's natural environment. Designation as an SSSI gives legal protection to the most important wildlife and geological sites.

Berkshire lies in the valleys of the Thames and its tributary, the River Kennet, and in the west it is crossed by chalk hills. It has a population of more than 860,000. It is no longer an administrative county following the abolition of Berkshire County Council in 1998. It is governed by six unitary authorities: Bracknell Forest, Reading, Slough, West Berkshire, Windsor and Maidenhead and Wokingham.

As of September 2019, there are 70 SSSIs in Berkshire, of which 8 are listed for their geological interest and 62 for their biological interest. Eight are Geological Conservation Review sites, three are Nature Conservation Review sites, two are Ramsar sites, five are Special Areas of Conservation, five are Special Protection Areas, five are Local nature reserves, one is listed on the Register of Historic Parks and Gardens and two contain Scheduled monuments. Fifteen sites are managed by Berkshire, Buckinghamshire and Oxfordshire Wildlife Trust, one by Surrey Wildlife Trust and three by the National Trust.

== Interest ==
- B = site of biological interest
- G = site of geological interest

== Public access ==
- FP = access to footpaths through the site only
- NO = no public access to site
- PL = public access at limited times
- PP = public access to part of site
- YES = public access to all or most of the site

== Other classifications ==
- BBOWT = Berkshire, Buckinghamshire and Oxfordshire Wildlife Trust
- GCR = Geological Conservation Review site
- LNR = Local nature reserve
- NCR = Nature Conservation Review site
- NT = National Trust
- Ramsar = Ramsar site, an internationally important wetland site
- RHPG= Register of Historic Parks and Gardens
- SAC = Special Area of Conservation
- SM = Scheduled monument
- SPA = Special Protection Area for birds
- SWT = Surrey Wildlife Trust

== Sites ==
| Site name | Photograph | B | G | Area (Note: The area and grid reference are taken from the "Details" page for each site on the Natural England database.) | Access | Location | Other | Map and Citation (Note: Citations are provided for each site by Natural England, and maps are provided on their Magic Map website.) | Description |
|---|---|---|---|---|---|---|---|---|---|
| Aldermaston Gravel Pits | Aldermaston Gravel Pits | ✓ | | 24.6 hectares (61 acres) | YES | Aldermaston; 51.397°N 1.145°W; SU596668 | | Map Citation | These flooded gravel pits and their islands provide an undisturbed habitat for many water birds, such as teal and shoveler. The pits are surrounded by scrub, marshland and woodland, which are important for many birds. Some 64 breeding species have been recorded. |
| Ashridge Wood | Ashridge Wood | ✓ | | 15.9 hectares (39 acres) | NO | Compton; 51.501°N 1.283°W; SU499782 | | Map Citation | This is coppiced woodland with oak standards on chalk and clay soils. The shrub layer has locally rare plants such as spiked star-of-Bethlehem, Solomon's seal, narrow-leaved everlasting pea and autumn crocus, which are all on the border of their range in Britain. |
| Avery's Pightle | Avery's Pightle | ✓ | | 1.3 hectares (3.2 acres) | YES | Enborne; 51.383°N 1.376°W; SU435651 | BBOWT | Map Citation | This unimproved meadow is species-rich and has surviving ridge and furrow, suggesting a long history of traditional management without modern herbicides or fertilisers. Twenty-four species of grass and a hundred and thirteen herbs have been recorded. There is a wet ditch which has water whorl grass. |
| Bisham Woods | Bisham Woods | ✓ | | 86.0 hectares (213 acres) | YES | Cookham; 51.557°N 0.765°W; SU857849 | LNR, SAC | Map Citation | Most of this site is broad-leaved woodland on well drained chalk soils, together with some areas on wet clay and others on glacial sands and gravels. It has one of the richest ground floras of any wood in the county, with dog's mercury and ivy dominant. There is also a mollusc fauna characteristic of ancient woodland on chalky soils, such as the snails Helicigona lapicida, Pomatias elegans and Cochlodina laminata. |
| Blackwater Valley | Blackwater Valley | ✓ | | 33.9 hectares (84 acres) | PP | Sandhurst; 51.337°N 0.785°W; SU847605 | | Map (Note: This site is partly in Hampshire.) Citation | The River Blackwater runs through the site, which also has wet valley alder wood, swamp and alluvial meadows. The meadows have several species of flora associated with ancient grassland and they are a nationally rare and threatened habitat. An area of deciduous woodland has the rare sedge, Carex elongata. |
| Bowdown and Chamberhouse Woods | Bowdown and Chamberhouse Woods | ✓ | | 67.9 hectares (168 acres) | PP | Thatcham; 51.385°N 1.270°W; SU508654 | BBOWT | Map Citation | The higher ground on this site has heath, acid grassland and mixed scrub on the sands and clays of the Bagshot Beds, together with areas of gravel. London Clay outcrops on the lower slopes, and it has woodland with rich ground flora. There are many deep valleys with unpolluted spring-fed streams. The insect fauna is also very rich. |
| Boxford Chalk Pit | Boxford Chalk Pit | | ✓ | 0.4 hectares (0.99 acres) | YES | Boxford; 51.444°N 1.383°W; SU430719 | GCR | Map Citation | This site has a unique succession of tilted beds dating to the Upper Cretaceous, between the late Coniacian and the Santonian, from around 87 to 84 million years ago. The beds are overlain by chalk which contains fractured and folded pieces of hardground, which are interpreted as evidence of localised tectonism unknown in the rest of Britain in this period. There are also coprolites and many tiny fish teeth. |
| Boxford Water Meadows | Boxford Water Meadows | ✓ | | 13.9 hectares (34 acres) | NO | Boxford; 51.444°N 1.386°W; SU428718 | SAC | Map Citation | The site comprises disused water meadows and flood pastures in the valley of the River Lambourn. Recorded flora include seventeen species of grass, seven of sedge and seventy-six of grassland herb, some of which are characteristic of ancient meadows which have not been improved or disturbed, such as devil's-bit scabious, water avens and Blysmus compressus, which is an uncommon flat-sedge. There is also a diverse insect fauna. |
| Bray Meadows | Bray Meadows | ✓ | | 6.6 hectares (16 acres) | NO | Maidenhead; 51.512°N 0.709°W; SU898800 | | Map Citation | These unimproved meadows adjacent to a side channel of the River Thames have a rich diversity of flora. River bank plants include the nationally scarce parasitic greater dodder. There are typical damp meadow plants such as meadow barley, lesser stitchwort and meadowsweet, while one of the fields has many ant hills. |
| Bray Pennyroyal Field | Bray Pennyroyal Field | ✓ | | 3.5 hectares (8.6 acres) | NO | Maidenhead; 51.495°N 0.683°W; SU915782 | | Map Citation | This field is a filled in gravel pit next to the River Thames. It is the only site in the county for the nationally rare pennyroyal, which is listed in the British Red Data Book of vascular plants. The site is grazed by horses, a management regime which is thought to be beneficial to the plant. |
| Briff Lane Meadows | Briff Lane Meadows | ✓ | | 8.9 hectares (22 acres) | NO | Thatcham; 51.428°N 1.220°W; SU544702 | | Map Citation | These meadows have unimproved traditionally managed grassland, a small stream, blackthorn dominated scrub, belts of woodland along the field edges, and hedges. Most of the site is poorly drained and seasonally waterlogged, but there are dry areas which have large populations of cowslip, heath-grass, devil's-bit scabious and dyer's greenweed. |
| Brimpton Pit | Brimpton Pit | | ✓ | 1.6 hectares (4.0 acres) | YES | Brimpton; 51.381°N 1.190°W; SU565650 | GCR | Map Citation | This former gravel pit contains fossil molluscs and pollen which were laid down during a warm phase 80,000 years ago which was first recognised at this site, and is called the Brimpton Interstadial (Marine Isotope Stage 5a). The pit is also important for helping to understand the development of the River Thames and its tributaries. |
| Broadmoor to Bagshot Woods and Heaths | Bagshot Heath | ✓ | | 1,696.3 hectares (4,192 acres) | PP | Sandhurst; 51.386°N 0.742°W; SU 877 640 | BBOWT, SPA, SWT | Map (Note: This site is partly in Surrey.) Citation | These woods have a variety of habitats with broadleaved woodland, a conifer plantation, heathland, valley mire and ponds. The heath and plantation support internationally important populations of three vulnerable birds, woodlark, nightjar and Dartford warbler, together with nationally important populations of dragonflies and damselflies. |
| Cannoncourt Farm Pit | Cannoncourt Farm Pit | | ✓ | 0.3 hectares (0.74 acres) | YES | Maidenhead; 51.539°N 0.737°W; SU877830 | GCR | Map Citation | In the early twentieth century, these gravel pits yielded many Paleolithic tools of the Acheulian and Levallois industries, associated with the Neanderthals, including the largest hand axe ever found. The site is in the Lynch Hill Terrace of the River Thames, dating to the Wolstonian Stage between 350 and 200,000 years ago. |
| Catmore and Winterly Copses | Catmore and Winterly Copses | ✓ | | 25.0 hectares (62 acres) | FP | Kintbury; 51.391°N 1.462°W; SU375659 | | Map Citation | This poorly drained wood is mainly hazel coppice with oak standards. It has one of the richest ground floras in the county, including several species characteristic of old coppiced woodland, such as dog's mercury, moschatel, hairy woodrush, yellow archangel, bugle and yellow pimpernel. |
| Chawridge Bourne | Chawridge Bourne | ✓ | | 9.3 hectares (23 acres) | YES | Winkfield; 51.454°N 0.715°W; SU894736 | BBOWT | Map Citation | Named Chawridge Bourne after the stream it follows, half is unimproved grassland managed by grazing sheep. There are also areas of scrub and broadleaved woodland, and on the east side an ancient parish boundary hedge with diverse trees. |
| Cleeve Hill | Cleeve Hill | ✓ | | 5.0 hectares (12 acres) | NO | Lambourn; 51.486°N 1.523°W; SU332765 | | Map Citation | Cleeve Hill is a sloping chalk grassland site with mixed scrub in the northern part. Flora include the Chiltern gentian, for which it is the most westerly known site. There are large populations of greater butterfly and twayblade orchids. The site is also important for its butterflies. |
| Cock Marsh | Cock Marsh | ✓ | | 18.3 hectares (45 acres) | YES | Cookham; 51.571°N 0.727°W; SU882866 | NT | Map Citation | This site has diverse meadow habitats in a small area, with wet alluvial grassland, calcareous grassland and acidic grassland on clay. It is managed by grazing by horses, cattle and rabbits. There are several ponds and the site is subject to periodic flooding, which helps to maintain its botanic richness. |
| Cold Ash Quarry | Cold Ash Quarry | | ✓ | 0.4 hectares (0.99 acres) | NO | Curridge; 51.439°N 1.282°W; SU500714 | GCR | Map Citation | The deposits in this fluvial site were laid down in the Paleocene, sixty million years ago. There are well preserved fossils of the leaves of flowering plants and this is the only British site which has fossil evidence of leaf miner activity. The site has been the subject of several important research papers. |
| Combe Wood and Linkenholt Hanging | Combe Wood and Linkenholt Hanging | ✓ | | 106.5 hectares (263 acres) | FP | Inkpen; 51.333°N 1.489°W; SU357595 | | Map Citation | Most of this site is semi-natural woodland on rendzina (humus-rich and shallow) soils. There are also areas of woods on chalk and acid soils, together with some chalk grassland and scrub. The woods have many fallow deer and birds, while the grassland has a rich chalk flora and a variety of insects. |
| Coombe Wood, Frilsham | Coombe Wood | ✓ | | 19.3 hectares (48 acres) | NO | Frilsham; 51.459°N 1.217°W; SU545736 | | Map Citation | This wood is first recorded in 1640. It has diverse habitats and flora, with many species typical of ancient woodland, such as pale sedge, thin-spiked sedge, scaly male fern, golden rod and bitter vetch. Butterflies include white admirals and dark green fritillaries. |
| Croker's Hole | Croker's Hole | ✓ | | 4.4 hectares (11 acres) | YES | Lambourn; 51.535°N 1.536°W; SU323820 | | Map Citation | The site is a narrow grassland valley, and it is one of the most florally diverse chalk downlands in Berkshire. The dominant plants are upright brome and tor-grass, and it is the only site in the county which has the nationally scarce bastard toadflax. |
| Decoy Pit, Pools and Woods | Decoy Heath Pond | ✓ | | 17.7 hectares (44 acres) | YES | Aldermaston; 51.365°N 1.124°W; SU611632 | BBOWT | Map Citation | This site on the sands and clays of the Bagshot Beds has diverse habitats, with heath, woods, grasslands and ponds. It has twenty-three species of breeding dragonfly and damselfly, the highest number of any site in the county. Rare fauna are woodlarks, silver-studded blue butterflies and Devon carpet moths. |
| Easton Farm Meadow | Easton Farm Meadow | ✓ | | 1.6 hectares (4.0 acres) | NO | Boxford; 51.446°N 1.400°W; SU418721 | | Map Citation | This unimproved meadow is neutral grassland with diverse herbs, a habitat which is rare in the county. The site is next to the River Lambourn and part of it is too wet for hay cutting, resulting in a rich insect fauna. Marsh flora include yellow iris, water dock, early marsh-orchid and lesser pond-sedge. |
| Enborne Copse | Enborne Copse | ✓ | | 11.9 hectares (29 acres) | NO | Newbury; 51.391°N 1.379°W; SU433660 | NCR | Map Citation | This semi-natural broad-leaved wood has many small-leaved lime, a tree which is rare in the county. The wood is surrounded by a medieval bank and ditch, and the current boundary is almost identical to that shown on Rocque's map of Berkshire in 1761, but most of it is now a conifer plantation and only the area designated as an SSSI retains its original character. |
| Englemere Pond | Englemere Pond | ✓ | | 26.1 hectares (64 acres) | YES | Ascot; 51.408°N 0.700°W; SU904685 | LNR | Map Citation | This large pond is surrounded by an area of swamp. There is a large amount of common reed and other flora include bog mosses, sundew, bog pondweed, spike-rush and St John's-wort. The swamp also provides a habitat for a variety of breeding birds, such as sedge warblers and reed bunting. There are also areas of woodland and a small heath. |
| Fognam Chalk Quarry | Fognam Chalk Quarry | | ✓ | 3.0 hectares (7.4 acres) | NO | Lambourn; 51.517°N 1.575°W; SU297799 | GCR | Map Citation | This former quarry provides the best exposure in southern England of a thin chalk layer laid down in the late Cretaceous, around 80 million year ago. It contains ammonite fossils which are important for relating the sequence on this site to similar ones elsewhere in Europe. |
| Freeman's Marsh | Freeman's Marsh | ✓ | | 26.1 hectares (64 acres) | YES | Hungerford; 51.415°N 1.528°W; SU329686 | | Map Citation | Freeman's Marsh is in the flood plain of the River Dun, which flows through the site. It has unimproved meadows, which have long been traditionally managed by grazing, marsh, reedbeds and scattered woodland. Many species of birds nest on the river bank and in the marshy meadows, including snipe, little grebes and mute swans, while sedge warblers, reed warblers and reed buntings nest in tall fen and reed. |
| Great Thrift Wood | Great Thrift Wood | ✓ | | 14.2 hectares (35 acres) | NO | Maidenhead; 51.495°N 0.747°W; SU871782 | | Map Citation | This is mainly ancient coppiced woodland on Reading Beds and alluvium. No trees have been planted, resulting in a wood with native species in a natural habitat. There is a rich shrub and ground flora layer which is dominated by bramble, but with many species found in ancient woods, such as enchanter's nightshade, yellow pimpernel and early-purple orchid. |
| Greenham and Crookham Commons | Crookham Commons | ✓ | | 280.5 hectares (693 acres) | YES | Greenham; 51.376°N 1.282°W; SU501644 | BBOWT | Map Citation | In the 1980s Greenham Common was a military base storing nuclear weapons and the location of the Women's Peace Camp, but following the closure of the base it was opened to the public as a nature reserve in 2000. The two commons have the largest area of heathland and acid grassland in the county and other habitats are gorse scrub, broad-leaved woodland and water-logged alder valleys. There is a rich variety of invertebrates, such as the white admiral, purple emperor and silver-washed fritillary woodland butterflies. |
| Hamstead Marshall Pit | Hamstead Marshall Pit | | ✓ | 0.2 hectares (0.49 acres) | NO | Hamstead Marshall; 51.393°N 1.406°W; SU414662 | GCR | Map Citation | This former gravel pit exposes gravels of the River Kennet, which were deposited around 450,000 years ago, during the Anglian ice age. Flint hand axes found on the site may be even older, showing that early humans were active in the Middle Palaeolithic in the area. |
| Heath Lake | Heath Lake | ✓ | | 6.0 hectares (15 acres) | YES | Crowthorne; 51.380°N 0.812°W; SU828652 | LNR | Map Citation | Most of this 2.8-hectare (7-acre) lake is less than 1 metre (3 feet) deep. It is the only acid lake in the county which retains its characteristic plants, such as alternate water-milfoil and six-stamened waterwort. The banks are peaty and marshy in some areas. There are also small areas of woodland, dry heath and acid grassland. |
| Hog's Hole | Hog's Hole | ✓ | | 23.7 hectares (59 acres) | NO | Inkpen; 51.334°N 1.459°W; SU378597 | | Map Citation | This dry chalk valley is traditionally managed by sheep grazing. Its unimproved chalk grassland has a diverse fauna and flora, including herbs such as mouse-ear hawkweed, rough hawkbit, lady's bedstraw, wild basil, eyebright, salad burnet, common milkwort and hoary plantain. |
| Holies Down | Holies Down | ✓ | | 5.6 hectares (14 acres) | YES | Streatley; 51.514°N 1.147°W; SU594798 | NT | Map Citation | This sloping site is an area of unimproved chalk grassland in the Berkshire Downs which is maintained by grazing. The turf is mainly composed of glaucous sedge, red fescue, sheep's fescue, quaking grass, yellow oat-grass, upright brome and tor-grass. |
| Inkpen and Walbury Hills | Inkpen Hill | ✓ | | 86.8 hectares (214 acres) | PP | Inkpen; 51.357°N 1.480°W; SU363621 | SM | Map Citation | These hills have the largest area of unimproved chalk downland in the county and much of it is managed by sheep grazing. North facing slopes have many mosses and herbs, such as hoary plantain and germander speedwell. There are also woods and hedgerows which provide a habitat for many species of breeding birds. |
| Inkpen Common | Inkpen Common | ✓ | | 12.8 hectares (32 acres) | YES | Inkpen; 51.375°N 1.454°W; SU381641 | BBOWT | Map Citation | This is a surviving fragment of the former Inkpen Great Common. It is mainly damp heathland, with small areas of marsh, woods and bracken. Flora on the heath include purple moor grass, common gorse, lousewort, lesser dodder and the only surviving colony in Berkshire of pale heath violet. |
| Inkpen Crocus Field | Inkpen Crocus Fields | ✓ | | 3.1 hectares (7.7 acres) | YES | Inkpen; 51.373°N 1.471°W; SU369639 | BBOWT | Map Citation | In 1912, Charles Rothschild founded 'The Society for the Promotion of Nature Reserves', the forerunner of The Wildlife Trusts, and Inkpen Crocus Field is one of the 284 'Rothschild Reserves', a list drawn up by the Society in its first three years of sites "worthy of preservation". The spring crocus is a rare Red Data Book plant which is not native to Britain but has been recorded on this site since 1800. More than 400,000 crocuses bloom in the spring. |
| Irish Hill Copse | Irish Hill Copse | ✓ | | 15.9 hectares (39 acres) | NO | Kintbury; 51.400°N 1.419°W; SU404670 | | Map Citation | This ancient coppiced wood has a rich ground flora. The chalky lower slopes are dominated by dog's mercury, while the acid higher ground has many plants which flower in the spring, such as wood sorrel, bluebell, wood anemone and woodruff. |
| Kennet and Lambourn Floodplain | Kennet and Lambourn Floodplain | ✓ | | 23.4 hectares (58 acres) | PP | Hungerford; 51.420°N 1.469°W; SU370691 | BBOWT, NCR, SAC | Map (Note: This site is partly in Wiltshire.) Citation | This site is composed of six widely separated areas in the floodplains of the Rivers Lambourn and Kennet. They all have fen or swamp with large numbers of Desmoulin's whorl snail, which is listed in the British Red Data Book as it is a nationally rare and declining species. One of the areas, Eddington Marsh, also has unimproved species-rich grassland with several nationally scarce invertebrates, such as the flies Pherbellia griseola, Psacadina verbekei, Platypalpus niger and Oxycera morrisi. |
| Kennet Valley Alderwoods | Kennet Valley Alderwoods | ✓ | | 57.3 hectares (142 acres) | NO | Newbury; 51.404°N 1.416°W; SU407674 | SAC | Map Citation | This site consists of two damp woods in the floodplain of the River Kennet, and the soil conditions range from waterlogged to dry. The dominant tree is alder and ash is also common. The bryophyte flora is diverse, including the uncommon Radula complanata, Zygodon viridissimus and Orthotrichum affine. |
| King's Copse | King's Copse | ✓ | | 13.7 hectares (34 acres) | FP | Bradfield; 51.431°N 1.173°W; SU576705 | | Map Citation | A small stream runs through this area of old coppiced woodland, which is mainly on London Clay. There is a rich ground flora, including wood anemone, woodsage, honeysuckle, bluebell and tormentil. |
| Lardon Chase | Lardon Chase | ✓ | | 14.9 hectares (37 acres) | YES | Streatley; 51.523°N 1.155°W; SU587809 | NT | Map Citation | This sloping site on the Berkshire Downs is unimproved chalk grassland. Steep areas on thin soils are grazed by rabbits. The site is particularly important for its butterfly species, including chalkhill blue, marbled white and the rare adonis blue at its last known locality in the county. |
| Lodge Wood and Sandford Mill | Sandford Mill | ✓ | | 2.3 hectares (5.7 acres) | NO | Wokingham; 51.453°N 0.876°W; SU782733 | | Map Citation | These two small woods are next to the River Loddon and are liable to flooding. They have more than 10% of the British population of the rare Loddon lily, which is listed in the British Red Data Book for vascular plants. Lodge Wood is shown on Rocque's map of Berkshire of 1761 and it may be ancient woodland, but its composition has been changed by management. |
| Longmoor Bog | Longmoor Bog | ✓ | | 14.0 hectares (35 acres) | YES | Finchampstead; 51.38°N 0.878°W; SU781653 | LNR | Map Citation | This is mainly carr woodland, together with areas of wet heath and secondary mixed woodland. A small stream runs through the carr woodland, which has peat to a depth of more than a metre and the ground is covered by mosses. The wet heath is important for insects, such as the bog bush cricket, silver-studded blue butterfly, emperor dragonfly, waved black moth and wood ant. |
| Old Copse, Beenham | Old Copse, Beenham | ✓ | | 8.0 hectares (20 acres) | NO | Beenham; 51.412°N 1.156°W; SU588684 | | Map Citation | This coppice with standards wood on London Clay has a rich variety of flora. The standards are mainly oak and ash, with coppice of hazel, wych elm and alder. The ground flora includes species indicative of ancient woodland, such as wild daffodil, the sedge Carex strigosa and orpine. |
| Park Farm Down | Park Farm Down | ✓ | | 3.3 hectares (8.2 acres) | NO | Lambourn; 51.541°N 1.572°W; SU298825 | | Map Citation | This is an area of scattered sarsen stones, which provide a habitat for rare lichens. It is the easternmost known site in Britain for Buellia saxorum, Candelariella coralliza and Ramalina siliquosa. |
| Pincent's Kiln | incents Kiln | | ✓ | 0.2 hectares (0.49 acres) | NO | Reading; 51.441°N 1.066°W; SU650719 | GCR | Map Citation | This former quarry provides the only remaining exposure of the Reading Beds, which date to the Paleocene sixty million years ago, in the area where it was first described. It shows that the locality was then a shallow sea, which then gave way to a riverine environment. Well preserved fossils of higher plants were found, including several previously unknown fruits and seeds. |
| Redhill Wood | Redhill Wood | ✓ | | 29.0 hectares (72 acres) | NO | Newbury; 51.379°N 1.396°W; SU422645 | | Map Citation | This ancient wood has a variety of stand types, a diverse ground flora and a rich insect fauna. More than 120 species of woodland vascular plants have been recorded, such as Solomon's seal and sanicle. There are rare bryophytes, including the only Trichocolea tomentella recorded in the county and Hookeria lucens at one of only two sites in the county. |
| River Kennet | River Kennet | ✓ | | 111.1 hectares (275 acres) | PP | Hungerford; 51.411°N 1.441°W; SU390681 | | Map Citation | Habitats in this site are the river itself, wet woodland, marshy grassland and reed beds. The flora is diverse, with the highest number of species of any lowland river in Britain, such as the nationally scarce river water-dropwort. There are also many species of invertebrates, including many mayflies and the nationally scarce cranefly Molophilus niger and caddis fly Ylodes conspersus. |
| River Lambourn | River Lambourn | ✓ | | 28.9 hectares (71 acres) | PP | Lambourn; 51.447°N 1.401°W; SU417722 | SPA | Map Citation | The upper stretches of this chalk river are a winterbourne which only flow in winter, and as a result they have an impoverished flora. The lower stretch is unique among southern lowland rivers in having Lemanea fluviatilis, which is a species of red algae which is sensitive to pollution. Invertebrates include five species which are nationally scarce, such as Crenobia alpina, which is found in the winterbourne section and is a flatworm which is thought to be an ice age relict. |
| Sandhurst to Owlsmoor Bogs and Heaths | Sandhurst to Owlsmoor Bogs and Heaths | ✓ | | 85.8 hectares (212 acres) | PP | Sandhurst; 51.357°N 0.789°W; SU843628 | BBOWT, SPA | Map Citation | This heath and woodland site also has a spring-fed valley mire described by Natural England as "of outstanding importance" for its extremely interesting flora, such as round and long-leaved sundews, white beak sedge, bog asphodel and flea sedge. |
| Seven Barrows | Seven Barrows | ✓ | | 4.0 hectares (9.9 acres) | YES | Lambourn; 51.543°N 1.527°W; SU328828 | BBOWT, SM | Map Citation | The site is part of a Bronze Age cemetery with scattered bowl barrows. The area is an unimproved chalk grassland with a rich flora and over 100 species of herbs have been recorded. It is also very rich in insects, especially butterflies, including small blue, brown argus, chalkhill blue, dark green fritillary and the scarce marsh fritillary. |
| Snelsmore Common | Snelsmore Common | ✓ | | 104.0 hectares (257 acres) | YES | Newbury; 51.436°N 1.340°W; SU460710 | BBOWT | Map Citation | This is a country park which has diverse habitats, including dry heath, wet heath, bog, birch woods and ancient semi-natural broadleaved woodland. The bog has a 5,000-year-old layer of peat which has been studied stratigraphically to show changes in ancient land use and vegetation. An area of wet alder woodland has many lichens, including a rich community which grows on trees, such as Parmelia caperarta, Pertusaria pertusa and Lecanactis abietina. |
| Stanford End Mill and River Loddon | Stanford End Mill and River Loddon | ✓ | | 11.8 hectares (29 acres) | NO | Swallowfield; 51.365°N 0.987°W; SU706634 | | Map Citation | Stanford End Mill meadows are seasonally waterlogged hay meadows which are traditionally managed and the site also includes a 4 kilometres (2.5 miles) stretch of the River Loddon. It has nationally important populations of two plants, the fritillary Fritillaria meleagris and the aquatic Loddon pondweed. Fauna include water voles and several species of nesting birds. |
| Streatley Warren | Streatley Warren | ✓ | | 31.3 hectares (77 acres) | PL | Streatley; 51.523°N 1.203°W; SU554807 | | Map Citation | Most of this site is flower-rich chalk grassland which is traditionally managed by grazing. It is important for insects, with butterflies such as marbled white, small heath, ringlet and common blue. Breeding birds include skylark, grey partridge and lapwing. |
| Sulham and Tidmarsh Woods and Meadows | Sulham and Tidmarsh Woods and Meadows | ✓ | | 75.7 hectares (187 acres) | PP | Reading; 51.464°N 1.082°W; SU639743 | BBOWT | Map Citation | This site has wet woodland in a valley bottom and wet and dry grassland. The invertebrate fauna is very rich and more than 300 species of moth have been recorded in the woods, such as water carpet, scarlet tiger, white marked, waved black and the micromoth Micropterix mansuetella. There are also 45 species of molluscs. |
| Swinley Park and Brick Pits | Swinley Park | ✓ | | 88.7 hectares (219 acres) | YES | Bracknell; 51.398°N 0.713°W; SU896673 | | Map Citation | The park is mainly a conifer plantation with scattered ancient oaks, sweet chestnuts and beech trees. Decaying trees have many rare species of insect. Swinley Brick Pits have several small pools which provide a habitat for dragonflies and waterfowl, as well as breeding sites for all three species of newts and a colony of marsh clubmoss. |
| Thatcham Reed Beds | Thatcham Reed Beds | ✓ | | 67.4 hectares (167 acres) | YES | Thatcham; 51.394°N 1.273°W; SU507664 | BBOWT, LNR, SAC | Map Citation | The site is nationally important for its reed beds, fen and species-rich alder woods. It is also nationally important for Desmoulin's whorl snails and there are many breeding birds, such as the nationally rare Cetti's warbler. Wetland plants include common valerian, skullcap and marsh bedstraw. |
| Wasing Wood Ponds | Wasing Wood Ponds | ✓ | | 13.5 hectares (33 acres) | FP | Aldermaston; 51.366°N 1.168°W; SU580633 | | Map Citation | This is an area of ponds, marshes and wet ditches. The site is important for dragonflies, with around 21 species breeding in or close to the site, more than half the British total, including some which are very uncommon. They include downy emerald, ruddy darter and brilliant emerald. |
| Wellington College Bog | Wellington College Bog | ✓ | | 6.2 hectares (15 acres) | YES | Sandhurst; 51.357°N 0.807°W; SU832627 | | Map Citation | The bog is rich in mosses, liverworts and flowering plants, including several which are uncommon in southern Britain. There are also areas of wet and dry heath, grazing marsh, secondary woodland and a small stream. Permanently wet areas are dominated by sphagnum mosses, and the insectivorous round-leaved sundew is very common. There are insects such as the bog bush cricket and keeled skimmer dragonfly. |
| West Woodhay Down | West Woodhay Down | ✓ | | 1.5 hectares (3.7 acres) | PP | Inkpen; 51.353°N 1.447°W; SU387617 | | Map Citation | This steeply sloping site on the Berkshire Downs is unimproved chalk grassland dominated by upright brome; but it has a rich variety of flora, including yellow-wort, purging flax, autumn hawkbit, wild mignonette, fragrant orchid and burnet saxifrage. |
| Westfield Farm Chalk Bank | Westfield Farm Chalk Bank | ✓ | | 14.1 hectares (35 acres) | YES | Lambourn; 51.483°N 1.492°W; SU353761 | | Map Citation | This chalk grassland bank is on the slope of the Berkshire Downs. It is maintained by cattle grazing and has a wide variety of native plants, including five species of orchid, common spotted, twayblade, pyramidal, frog and greater butterfly. |
| West's Meadow, Aldermaston | West's Meadow, Aldermaston | ✓ | | 1.2 hectares (3.0 acres) | NO | Aldermaston; 51.359°N 1.144°W; SU597626 | | Map Citation | The meadow is grassland which is crossed by a small stream, and much of the site is damp. It has been managed by grazing for more than thirty years and there are more than eighty species of grassland plants, many of which are mainly confined to ancient meadows which have not been disturbed or improved for a long time. The stream has aquatic plants such as water starwort and celery-leaved buttercup. |
| White Shute | Watts Bank | ✓ | | 1.9 hectares (4.7 acres) | YES | Lambourn; 51.492°N 1.526°W; SU330771 | BBOWT | Map Citation | This steeply sloping site is an area of unimproved grassland and scrub. There is a rich variety of herbs, such as salad burnet, lady's bedstraw, rough hawkbit and harebell. There are also many species of butterfly, including the uncommon Duke of Burgundy. |
| Windsor Forest and Great Park | Windsor Great Park | ✓ | | 1,778.9 hectares (4,396 acres) | YES | Windsor; 51.444°N 0.632°W; SU 952 725 | NCR, RHPG, SAC | Map Citation | This large site has woodland with many ancient trees and large areas of parkland. It is second only to the New Forest for the diversity of its invertebrates, including many Red Data Book beetles and flies. There is an internationally important population of the violet click beetle. The fungi species are very diverse, including some which are extremely rare. |
| Winterbourne Chalk Pit | Winterbourne Chalk Pit | | ✓ | 0.1 hectares (0.25 acres) | NO | Winterbourne; 51.447°N 1.358°W; SU447722 | GCR | Map Citation | This disused chalk pit exposes a series of phosphate-rich chalk layers deposited 80 million years ago, during the Upper Cretaceous, under a warm sea which then covered a large part of Europe. The sediments provide evidence of severe earth movements in the area and they are rich in macrofossils, especially belemnites. |
| Woolhampton Reed Bed | Woolhampton Reed Bed | ✓ | | 6.0 hectares (15 acres) | NO | Woolhampton; 51.396°N 1.172°W; SU578666 | | Map Citation | This site on London Clay mainly consists of dense reed beds, but there are also areas of carr woodland and tall fen. More than 300 moth species have been recorded, including the obscure wainscot, burnished brass and butterbur. The site is also important for flies, with over 160 species. |
| Wraysbury and Hythe End Gravel Pits | Wraysbury and Hythe End Gravel Pits | ✓ | | 117.2 hectares (290 acres) | FP | Windsor; 51.451°N 0.545°W; TQ012735 | Ramsar, SPA | Map Citation | This site has four flooded gravel pits in the floodplains of the River Thames and the Colne Brook. Other habitats are islands, woodland, scrub and grassland. There are nationally important populations of three species of wintering wildfowl, tufted duck, gadwall and goosander. Invertebrates include two species listed in the British Red Data Book, the riffle beetle Oulimnius major and the caddisfly Leptocerus lusitanius. |
| Wraysbury No 1 Gravel Pit | Wraysbury No. 1 Gravel Pit | ✓ | | 58.0 hectares (143 acres) | NO | Windsor; 51.463°N 0.556°W; TQ003747 | Ramsar, SPA | Map Citation | This former gravel pit was excavated in the 1950s and it is now a lake which is nationally important for wintering gadwall. It is also locally important for other wintering birds such as great crested grebe, cormorant, pochard and coot. The surrounding woodland and scrub have a variety of woodland birds. |
| Wykery Copse | Wykery Copse | ✓ | | 3.2 hectares (7.9 acres) | YES | Bracknell; 51.41°N 0.779°W; SU850686 | | Map Citation | The copse has diverse broadleaved woodland habitats with several rare species of flora. Trees include alder, birch and hazel, which have been coppiced, unlike the oaks. There is also a colony of rare wild service trees, together with a large area of mosses. |

== See also ==
- Berkshire, Buckinghamshire and Oxfordshire Wildlife Trust
- List of local nature reserves in Berkshire

== Sources ==
- Ratcliffe, Derek, ed. (1977). A Nature Conservation Review. Vol. 2. Cambridge, UK: Cambridge University Press. ISBN 978-0-521-21403-2.
