= Wykery Copse =

Site of Special Scientific Interest in Berkshire

- Site of Special Scientific Interest
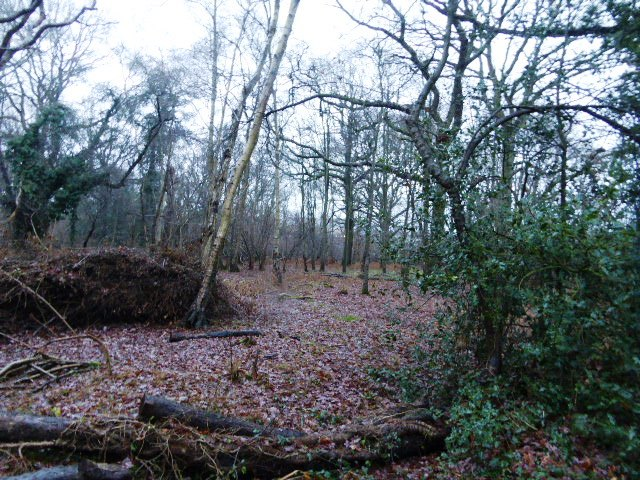

- Location within Berkshire
- Location of Wykery Copse.
- Area of search: Berkshire
- Grid reference: SU 850 686
- Coordinates: 51°24′37″N 0°46′40″W
- Interest: Biological
- Area: 3.2 hectares (7.9 acres)
- Notification date: 1984
- Location map: Magic Map

Wykery Copse is a 3.2-hectare (7.9-acre) biological Site of Special Scientific Interest west of Bracknell in Berkshire.

== Access ==
There is access from Green Walk.

== Flora ==
The site has the following Flora:

=== Trees ===
- Birch
- Alder
- Fraxinus
- Maple
- Quercus robur
- Hazel
- Ulmus minor 'Atinia'
- Sorbus torminalis
- Prunus avium
- Rowan
- Holly
- Salix fragilis
- Salix atrocinerea
- Aspen
- Malus
- Populus x serotina
- Prunus spinosa
- Crataegus
- Cornus
- Quercus cerris

=== Plants ===
- Honeysuckle
- Ribes sylvestre
- Viburnum opulus
- Hyacinthoides non-scripta
- Carex strigosa
- Carex pallescens
- Orchis mascula
- Anemone nemorosa
- Conopodium majus
- Lamiastrum galeobdolon
- Lysimachia nemorum
- Oxalis acetosella
- Primula vulgaris
- Scrophularia nodosa
- Veronica montana
- Melica uniflora
- Milium effusum
- Bromus ramosus
- Hypnum cupressiforme

== See also ==
- List of Sites of Special Scientific Interest in Berkshire
