= Coombe Wood, Frilsham =

Protected area in Berkshire, England

- Site of Special Scientific Interest
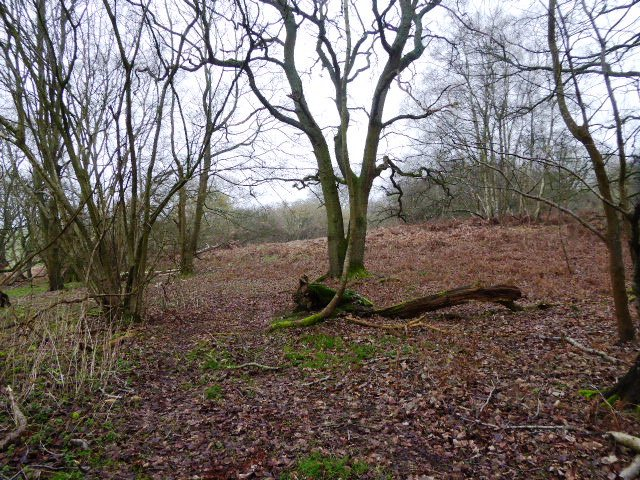

- Location within Berkshire
- Location of Coombe Wood, Frilsham.
- Area of search: Berkshire
- Grid reference: SU 545 736
- Coordinates: 51.459°N 1.217°W
- Interest: Biological
- Area: 19.3 hectares (48 acres)
- Notification date: 1985
- Location map: Magic Map

Coombe Wood, Frilsham is a 19.3-hectare (48-acre) biological Site of Special Scientific Interest south of Frilsham in Berkshire. It is in the North Wessex Downs, which is an Area of Outstanding Natural Beauty.

The woods are broadleaved, mixed and yew, located in a lowland area. The woodland was first recorded in 1640.

== Fauna ==
The site has the following animals:

- Fallow Deer
- Roe Deer
- Muntjac

=== Invertebrates ===
- Limenitis camilla
- Dark green fritillary

== Flora ==
The site has the following flora:

=== Trees ===
- Fraxinus
- Quercus petraea
- Quercus robur
- Hazel

=== Plants ===
- Hyacinthoides non-scripta
- Mercurialis perennis
- Luzula sylvatica
- Carex pallescens
- Carex strigosa
- Dryopteris affinis
- Solidago virgaurea
- Lathyrus montanus
- Lychnis flos-cuculi
- Dactylorhiza fuchsii
- Galium palustre
- Mentha aquatica
- Ranunculus flammula
