= Redhill Wood =

Protected area in Berkshire, England

- Site of Special Scientific Interest
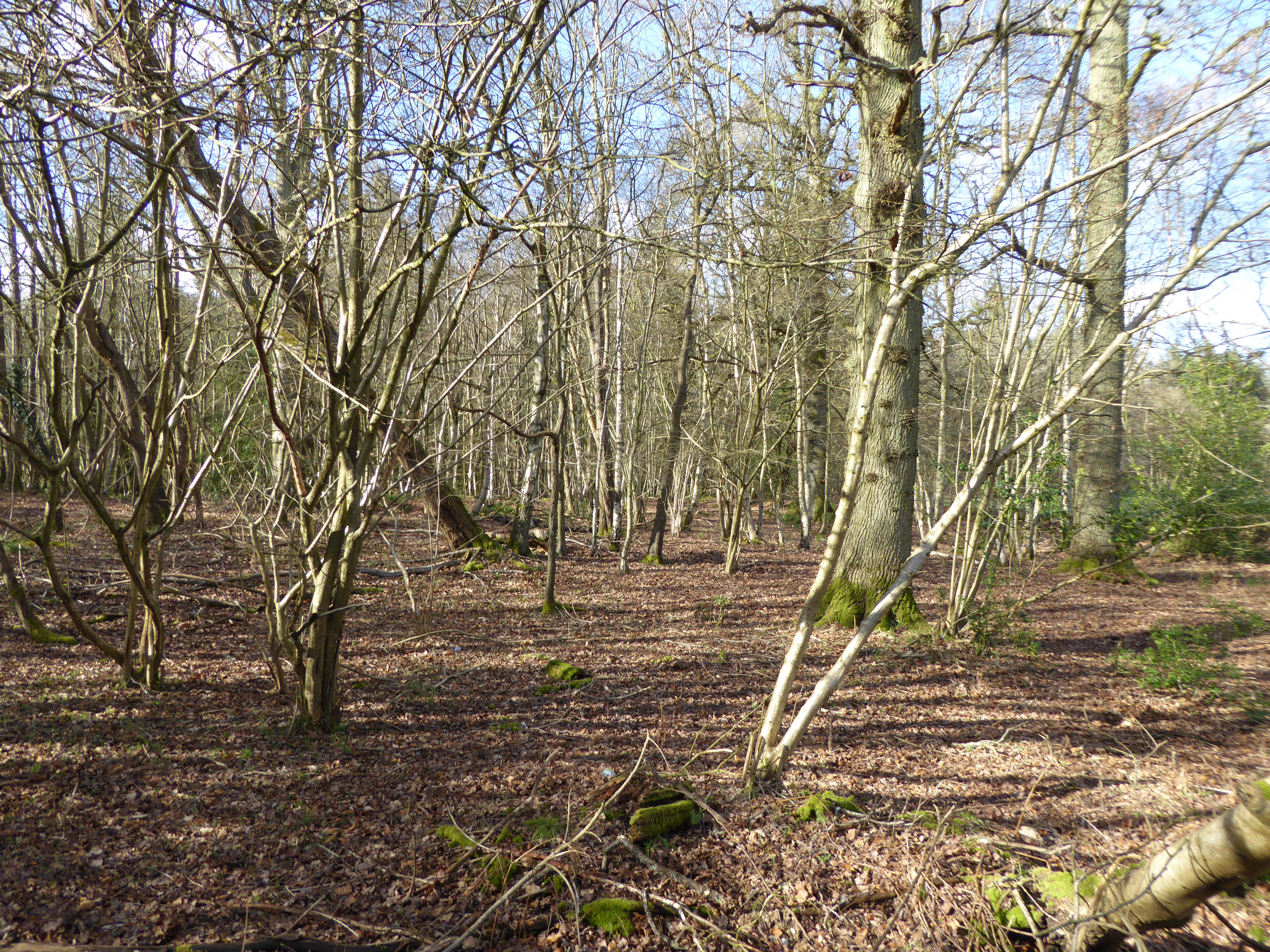

- Location within Berkshire
- Location of Redhill Wood.
- Area of search: Berkshire
- Grid reference: SU 422 645
- Coordinates: 51.379°N 1.396°W
- Interest: Biological
- Area: 29.0 hectares (72 acres)
- Notification date: 1985
- Location map: Magic Map

Redhill Wood is a 29-hectare (72-acre) biological Site of Special Scientific Interest west of Newbury in Berkshire.

The site is private land with no public access.

== Fauna ==
The site has the following animals

=== Invertebrates ===
- Sicus ferrugineus
- Poecilobothrus nobilatatus
- Clossiana selene
- Ectobius lapponicus

== Flora ==
The site has the following Flora:

=== Trees ===
- Birch
- Fraxinus
- Tilia
- Quercus robur
- Hazel
- Alder
- Castanea sativa
- Salix caprea
- Cornus sanguinea
- Populus tremula
- Sambucus nigra
- Quercus petraea

=== Plants ===
- Paris quadrifolia
- Sanicula europaea
- Polygonatum multiflorum
- Solidago virgaurea
- Melampyrum pratense
- Carex strigosa
- Dryopteris affinis
- Trichocolea tomentella
- Hookeria lucens
- Leucodon sciuroides
- Orthotrichum lyellii
- Lecanactis abietina
- Mycena clavularis
