= Inkpen Common =

Hamlet in Berkshire, England

Coordinates: 51.3749°N 1.4557°W

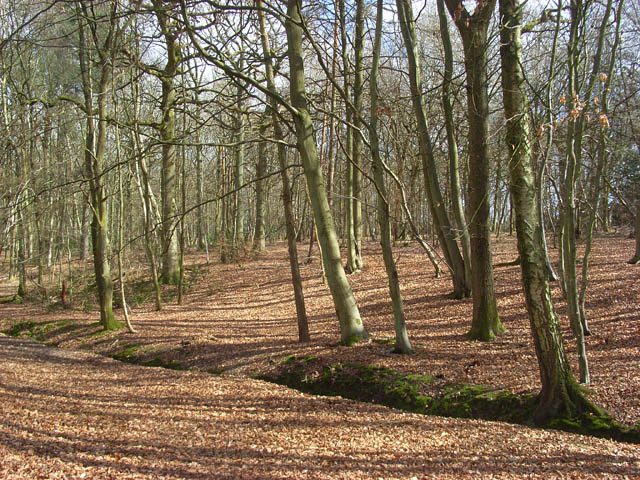
- Woodland in Inkpen Common

- Location within Berkshire
- OS grid reference: SU378641
- Metropolitan borough: West Berkshire
- Metropolitan county: Berkshire
- Region: South East
- Country: England
- Sovereign state: United Kingdom
- Post town: HUNGERFORD
- Postcode district: RG17
- Dialling code: 01488
- Police: Thames Valley
- Fire: Royal Berkshire
- Ambulance: South Central
- UK Parliament: Berkshire

Inkpen Common is a hamlet in the English county of Berkshire, within the civil parish of Inkpen.

The settlement lies south of the A4 road and approximately 4 miles (6.4 km) south-east of Hungerford. It is the location of the Crown and Garter public house. Part of the old common remains as a Site of Special Scientific Interest, called Inkpen Common SSSI, between the hamlet and Hell Corner. It is managed by the Berkshire, Buckinghamshire and Oxfordshire Wildlife Trust.
