= King's Copse =

Site of Special Scientific Interest in Berkshire

- Site of Special Scientific Interest
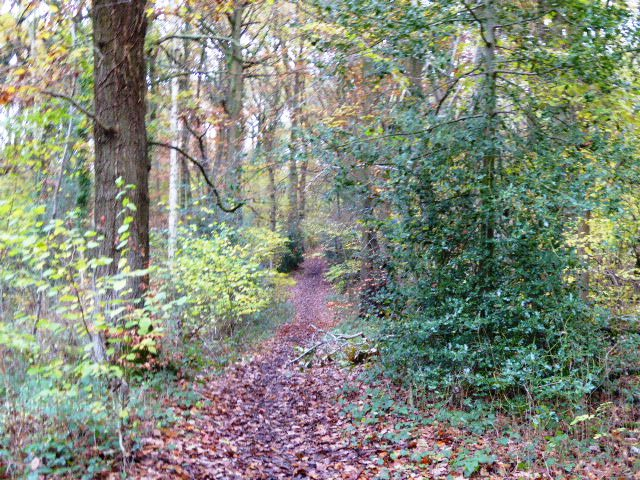

- Location within Berkshire
- Location of King's Copse.
- Area of search: Berkshire
- Grid reference: SU 576 705
- Coordinates: 51.431°N 1.173°W
- Interest: Biological
- Area: 13.7 hectares (34 acres)
- Notification date: 1985
- Location map: Magic Map

King's Copse is a 13.7-hectare (34-acre) biological Site of Special Scientific Interest between Chapel Row and Clay Hill in Berkshire. It is in the North Wessex Downs, which is an Area of Outstanding Natural Beauty. The site is private land but a public footpath runs through it.

== Geography ==
King's Copse is a broadleaf, mixed and yew woodland located in a lowland area.

== Fauna ==
The site has the following animals

=== Mammals ===
- Badger

=== Reptiles ===
- Grass snake

== Flora ==
The site has the following Flora:

=== Trees ===
- Birch
- Fraxinus
- Ulmus glabra
- Quercus robur
- Hazel
- Alder
- Acer campestre
- Holly
- Aspen
- Prunus avium
- Salix × fragilis
- Rowan

=== Plants ===
- Anemone nemorosa
- Teucrium scorodonia
- Lonicera periclymenum
- Hyacinthoides non-scripta
- Potentilla erecta
- Sanicula europaea
- Ajuga reptans
- Filipendula ulmaria
- Scrophularia nodosa
- Scrophularia aquatica
- Lychnis flos-cuculi
- Chrysosplenium oppositifolium
- Carex sylvatica
- Carex remota
- Carex strigosa
- Urtica dioica
- Oenanthe crocata
- Luzula pilosa
- Adoxa moschatellina
- Euphorbia amygdaloides
- Primula vulgaris
- Viola riviniana
- Viola reichenbachiana
- Hypericum androsaemum
