= Bisham Woods =

Woodland in Berkshire, England

- Site of Special Scientific Interest
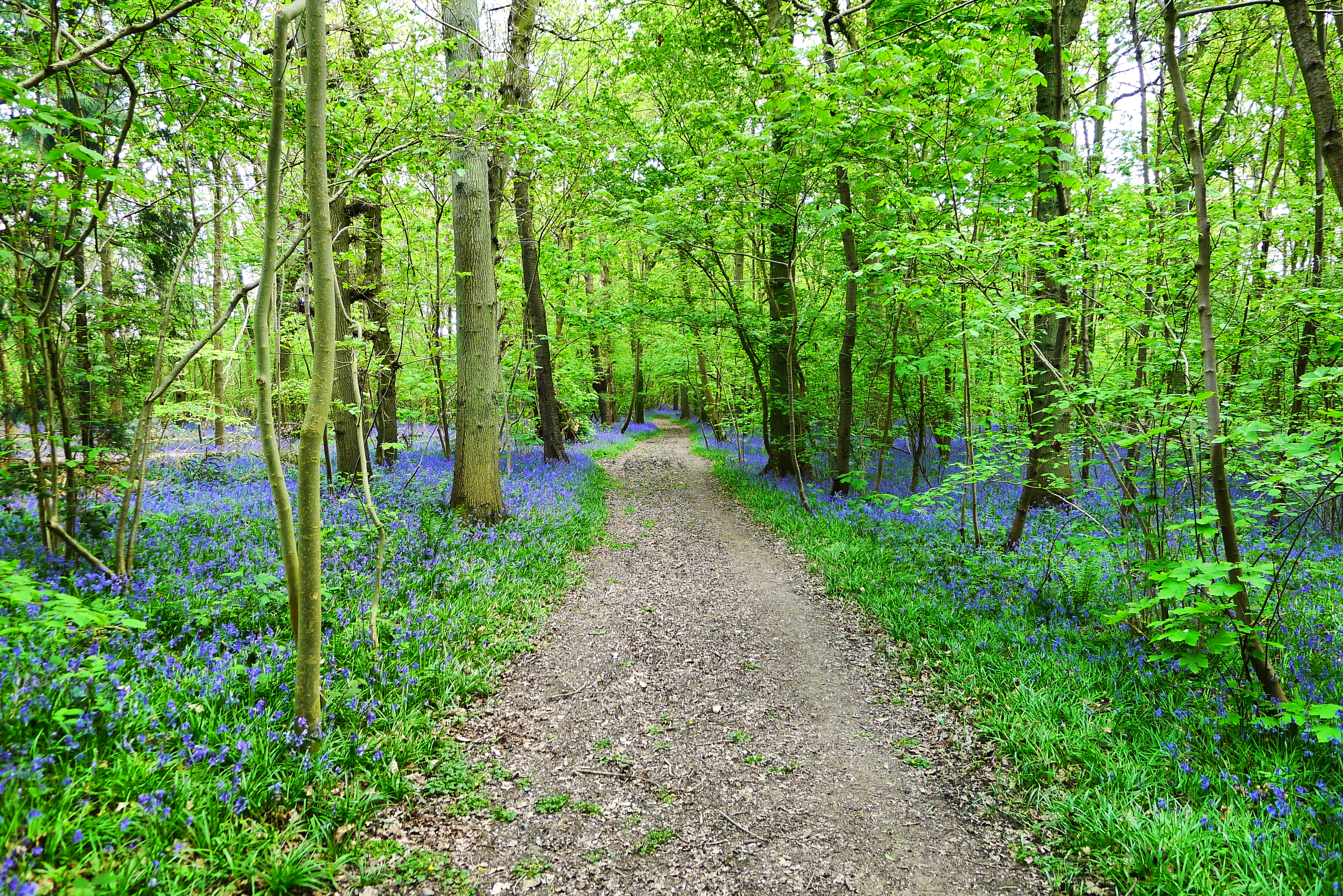
- Location of Bisham Woods.
- Area of search: Berkshire
- Grid reference: SU 857 849
- Coordinates: 51.5574°N 0.7666°W
- Interest: Biological
- Area: 86.0 hectares (213 acres)
- Notification date: 1984
- Location map: Magic Map

Bisham Woods is an 86-hectare (210-acre) biological Site of Special Scientific Interest (SSSI) west of Cookham in Berkshire. The site is also a Local Nature Reserve and part of Chilterns Beechwoods Special Area of Conservation. The SSSI is part of a 153.2-hectare (379-acre) site, also called Bisham Woods, which has been owned and managed by the Woodland Trust since 1990.

The woods consist of several sections. The northern part is the ancient woodland SSSI, with compartments known as Quarry Wood, Fultness Wood, High Wood and Inkydown Wood. With the River Thames just to the north, and views across the Chiltern Hills, they include beechwoods, with rare woodland orchids. The remaining compartments, including Park Wood, High Wood, Goulding's Wood, Carpenters Wood and Dungrovehill Wood, are areas of 19th- and 20th-century planting noted for bluebells. These are nearer Maidenhead, near the A308 and A404. The woods are open to the public, and are well served with paths and bridleways, with parking nearby.

Quarry Wood is the site of Bisham Quarry, an important medieval source of stone, much of which was used to build Windsor Castle. From medieval times the woods were part of the extensive Bisham Estates of the Earls of Salisbury. An ice house, built in the 1760s to provide ice for Bisham Abbey, is within the woods, and opened to the public four times a year. The woods are the original 'Wild Wood' in Kenneth Grahame's 1908 children's book The Wind in the Willows, which he wrote in the nearby village of Cookham Dean. Percy Bysshe Shelley composed The Revolt of Islam in the area of Bisham Woods in 1817 when he was living at Marlow.

A memorial in Carpenters Wood commemorates the crash site of a Halifax Bomber from the Royal Air Force 578 Squadron, on 18 July 1944. The memorial was dedicated on 18 July 1998.

== See also ==
- List of ancient woods in England
- List of Sites of Special Scientific Interest in Berkshire
