= Hell Corner =

Hamlet in Berkshire, England

Coordinates: 51.3758°N 1.4487°W

Hell Corner is a hamlet in the civil parish of Inkpen in the English county of Berkshire. It is situated in the West Berkshire district, south of the River Kennet, between Newbury and Hungerford and close to the Hampshire border. Although wholly within Inkpen, it lies right on the border with Kintbury and West Woodhay and adjoins Inkpen Common. Inkpen Great Common is a Site of Special Scientific Interest between Hell Corner and Inkpen Common. It is managed by the Berkshire, Buckinghamshire and Oxfordshire Wildlife Trust. The Ordnance Survey grid reference is SU3864.
