= Park Farm Down =

Protected area in Berkshire, England

- Site of Special Scientific Interest
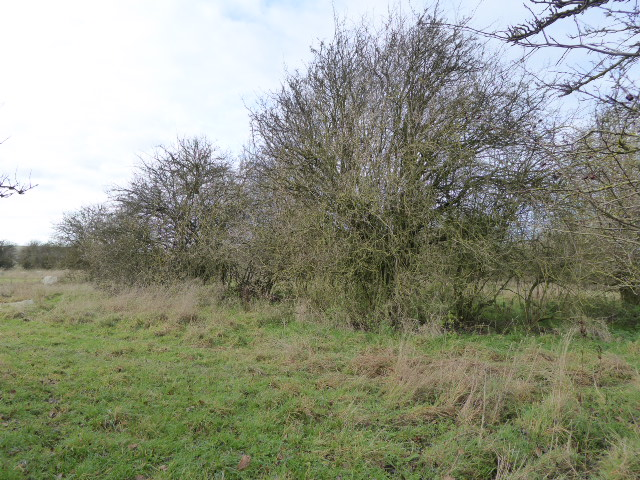

- Location within Berkshire
- Location of Park Farm Down.
- Area of search: Berkshire
- Grid reference: SU 298 825
- Coordinates: 51.541°N 1.572°W
- Interest: Biological
- Area: 3.3 hectares (8.2 acres)
- Notification date: 1982
- Location map: Magic Map

Park Farm Down or Parkfarm Down is a 3.3-hectare (8.2-acre) biological Site of Special Scientific Interest north-west of Lambourn in Berkshire. It is in the North Wessex Downs, which is an Area of Outstanding Natural Beauty.

== Geography ==
The site features an area of scattered sarsen stones which are now extremely rare on the Berkshire Downs.

== Fauna ==
The site has the following Fauna:

=== Lychens ===
- Buellia saxorum
- Candelariella coralliza
- Ramalina siliquosa
