= The Revolt of Islam =

1818 poem by Percy Bysshe Shelley

- A Poem, in Twelve Cantos
- by Percy Bysshe Shelley
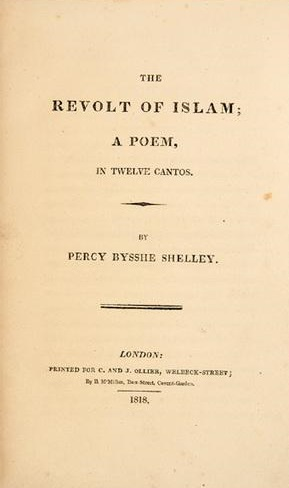
- Cover, circa 1818
- Original title: Laon and Cythna; or, The Revolution of the Golden City: A Vision of the Nineteenth Century
- Written: 1817
- Country: United Kingdom
- Language: English language
- Form: Spenserian stanza
- Publisher: Charles and James Ollier
- Publication date: 1818
- Lines: 4,818

Full text
- The Revolt of Islam at Wikisource

The Revolt of Islam (1818) is a poem in twelve cantos composed by Percy Bysshe Shelley in 1817. The poem was originally published under the title Laon and Cythna; or, The Revolution of the Golden City: A Vision of the Nineteenth Century by Charles and James Ollier in December 1817. Shelley composed the work in the vicinity of Bisham Woods, near Great Marlow in Buckinghamshire, northwest of London, from April to September.

The plot centres on two characters named Laon and Cythna, inhabitants of Argolis under Ottoman rule who initiate a revolution against its despotic ruler. Despite its title, the poem is not focused on Islam as a specific religion, though the general subject of religion is addressed, and the work draws on Orientalist archetypes and themes. The work is a symbolic parable on liberation and revolutionary idealism following the disillusionment of the French Revolution.

Laon and Cythna lead a peaceful, nonviolent revolution against the tyrannical Sultan Othman to achieve liberty, equality, and intellectual freedom. A Hermit befriends Laon, mentors him, and frees him from captivity.

The poem was the subject of discussion among Shelley scholars during the Arab Spring that emerged in the early 2010s.

== Background ==
In The Revolt of Islam, A Poem, in Twelve Cantos (1818), consisting of 4,818 lines, Shelley returned to the social and political themes of Queen Mab: A Philosophical Poem (1813). The poem is in Spenserian stanzas with each stanza containing nine lines in total: eight lines in iambic pentameter followed by a single Alexandrine line in iambic hexameter. The rhyme pattern is "ababbcbcc". It was written in the spring and summer of 1817.

His wife, Mary Shelley, described the work as follows:

He chose for his hero a youth nourished in dreams of liberty, some of whose actions are in direct opposition to the opinions of the world, but who is animated throughout by an ardent love of virtue, and a resolution to confer the boons of political and intellectual freedom on his fellow-creatures. He created for this youth a woman such as he delighted to imagine—full of enthusiasm for the same objects; and they both, with will unvanquished and the deepest sense of the justice of their cause, met adversity and death. There exists in this poem a memorial of a friend of his youth. The character of the old man who liberates Laon from his tower prison, and tends on him in sickness, is founded on that of naturalist Doctor James Lind, who, when Shelley was at Eton, had often stood by to befriend and support him, and whose name he never mentioned without love and veneration.

Shelley himself gave two accounts of the poem. In a letter to William Godwin, 11 December 1817, he wrote:

The Poem was produced by a series of thoughts which filled my mind with unbounded and sustained enthusiasm. I felt the precariousness of my life, and I engaged in this task, resolved to leave some record of myself. Much of what the volume contains was written with the same feeling, as real, though not so prophetic, as the communications of a dying man. I never presumed indeed to consider it anything approaching to faultless; but when I consider contemporary productions of the same apparent pretensions, I own I was filled with confidence. I felt that it was in many respects a genuine picture of my own mind. I felt that the sentiments were true, not assumed. And in this have I long believed that my power consists; in sympathy and that part of the imagination which relates to sentiment and contemplation. I am formed, if for anything not in common with the herd of mankind, to apprehend minute and remote distinctions of feeling, whether relative to external nature or the living beings which surround us, and to communicate the conceptions which result from considering either the moral or the material universe as a whole. Of course, I believe these faculties, which perhaps comprehend all that is sublime in man, to exist very imperfectly in my own mind.

In a letter to a publisher, Shelley wrote on 13 October 1817:

The whole poem, with the exception of the first canto and part of the last, is a mere human story without the smallest intermixture of supernatural interference. The first canto is, indeed, in some measure a distinct poem, though very necessary to the wholeness of the work. I say this because, if it were all written in the manner of the first canto, I could not expect that it would be interesting to any great number of people. I have attempted in the progress of my work to speak to the common elementary emotions of the human heart, so that, though it is the story of violence and revolution, it is relieved by milder pictures of friendship and love and natural affections. The scene is supposed to be laid in Constantinople and modern Greece, but without much attempt at minute delineation of Mahometan manners. It is, in fact, a tale illustrative of such a revolution as might be supposed to take place in a European nation, acted upon by the opinions of what has been called (erroneously, as I think) the modern philosophy, and contending with ancient notions and the supposed advantage derived from them to those who support them. It is a Revolution of this kind that is the beau idéal, as it were, of the French Revolution, but produced by the influence of individual genius and out of general knowledge.

== Censorship ==
It was originally published under the title Laon and Cythna; or, The Revolution of the Golden City: A Vision of the Nineteenth Century. The publishers, Charles and James Ollier, however, refused to print the work because of its theme of incest and its statements on religion. Only a few copies were issued. They demanded changes to the text. Shelley made 49 changes. The work was republished in 1818 under the title The Revolt of Islam.

The relationship between Laon and Cythna is changed from biological siblings to adopted ones (canto 2, stanza 21 "I had a little sister" becomes "An orphan with my parents lived"). The critique of religion is still present, but couched in vaguer terms:

Canto 8, end of stanza 6 and beginning of 7
Laon and Cythna

And that men say, God has appointed Death
On all who scorn his will to wreak immortal wrath.
Men say they have seen God, and heard from God,
Or known from others who have known such things,
And that his will is all our law, a rod
To scourge us into slaves—that Priests and Kings,

The Revolt of Islam

And that men say, that Power has chosen Death
On all who scorn it's laws, to wreak immortal wrath.
Men say that they themselves have heard and seen,
Or known from others who have known such things,
A Shade, a Form, which Earth and Heaven between
Wields an invisible rod—that Priests and Kings,

== Preface ==
In the Preface to the work, Shelley explained his purpose for its composition:

The Poem which I now present to the world is an attempt from which I scarcely dare to expect success, and in which a writer of established fame might fail without disgrace. It is an experiment on the temper of the public mind, as to how far a thirst for a happier condition of moral and political society survives, among the enlightened and refined, the tempests which have shaken the age in which we live. I have sought to enlist the harmony of metrical language, the ethereal combinations of the fancy, the rapid and subtle transitions of human passion, all those elements which essentially compose a Poem, in the cause of a liberal and comprehensive morality; and in the view of kindling within the bosoms of my readers a virtuous enthusiasm for those doctrines of liberty and justice, that faith and hope in something good, which neither violence nor misrepresentation nor prejudice can ever totally extinguish among mankind.

== Dedication ==
The Poem has a dedication to Mary Shelley comprising a verse by George Chapman and an original 14 stanza poem.

== Characters ==
- Laon: The protagonist, a youth who strives to achieve liberty, equality, and intellectual freedom through nonviolence. He convinces the people to overthrow their oppressive rule and achieve justice, equal rights, and individual freedom.
- Cythna (also known as Kifna or Laone): Laon’s companion who like Laon espouses liberty and equality for women. Together with Laon, she leads a peaceful, nonviolent revolution against the Sultan Othman.
- Othman: The tyrannical and despotic Sultan of the Ottoman Empire who rules in the Golden City. He represents oppressive power and arbitrary and dictatorial rule.
- The Hermit: A kind elderly man who befriends Laon and helps him escape. He frees Laon from a high pillar and removes his chains, taking him to an island where he takes care of him and mentors him on nonviolence.

== Plot ==
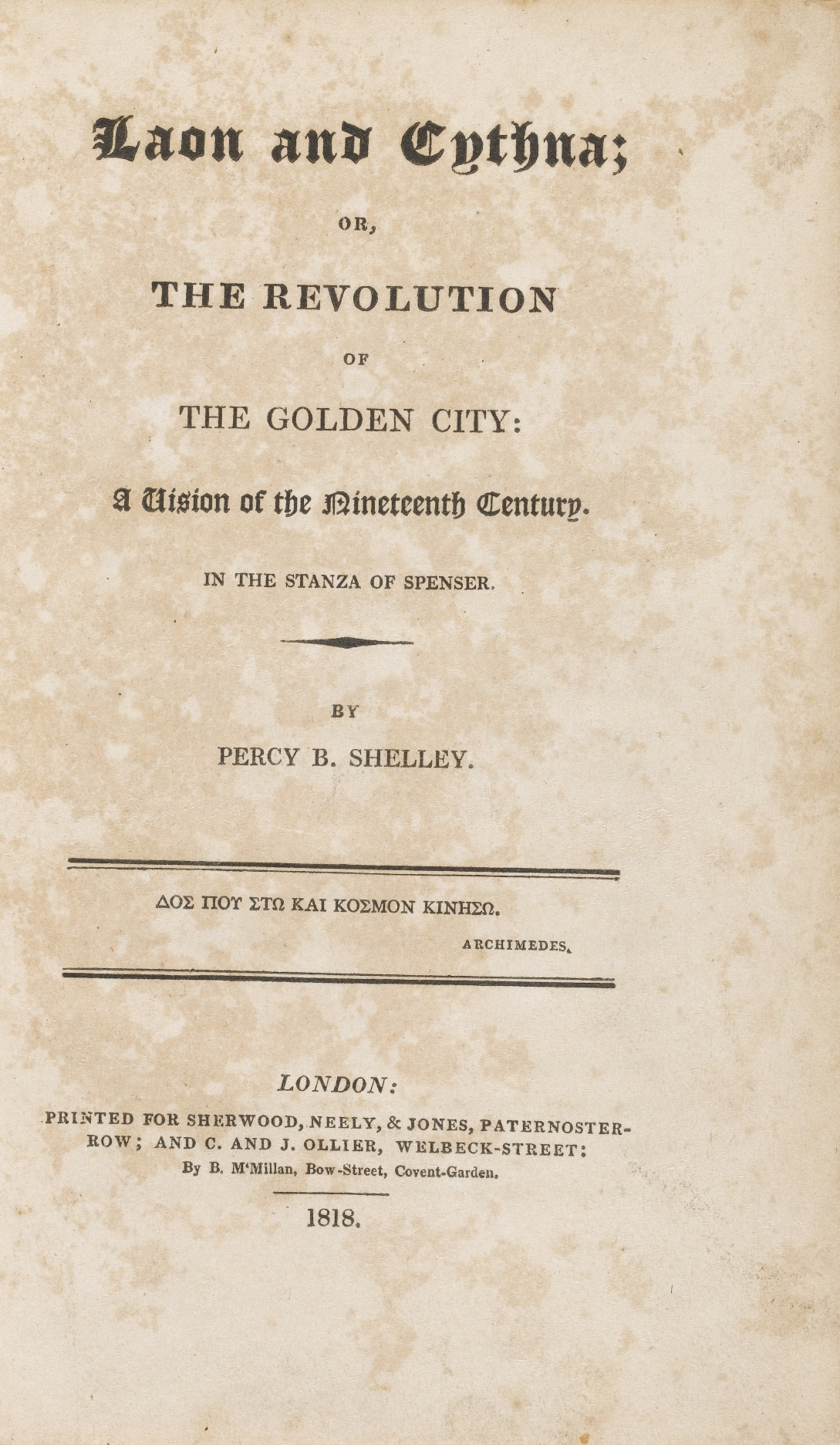
Laon and Cythna. Title page. London. 1818.

In the first canto, the poet climbs a mountain from which he observes an eagle and a snake battle. The eagle prevails. A woman takes the poet and the wounded snake in a boat. The poet is placed for a time in the regions of eternal repose, where the good and great of mankind are represented as recounting, before the throne of the Spirit of Good, their earthly sufferings and labours. Among these are two, a man and a woman of the country of Argolis, who, after rescuing their country for a brief time from the tyranny of the house of Othman and accomplishing this great revolution by the force of persuasive eloquence and the sympathies of human love alone, without violence, bloodshed, or revenge, saw the fruit of all their toils blasted by foreign invasion, and the dethroned but not insulted tyrant replaced upon his seat. Finally, amidst all the darkness of their country's horizon, Laon and Cythna died, without fear, the death of heroic martyrdom, burned alive at the stake, gathering consolation, in the last pangs of their expiring nature, from the hope and the confidence that their faith and example might yet raise up successors to their labours, and that they had neither lived nor died in vain. In the persons of these martyrs, Shelley has striven to embody his ideas of the power and beauty of human affections, and, in their history, he has set forth a series of pictures, illustrating the efficacy of these affections in overcoming the evils of private and of public life.

As the poem opens, Laon and Cythna live in daydreams of delight. This tranquility is soon shattered. The troops of Othman, a tyrant, come and seize Cythna for Othman's harem as food "To the hyena lust, who, among graves, Over his loathed meal, laughing in agony, raves." Laon reacts by killing three of the attackers. The remaining troops drag him away to await his punishment in a prison. Laon suffers from thirst and hunger, but seeks to find Cythna. A white sail is set on the bay below him, and he feels that the vessel is destined to bear Cythna from the shore. The thought of this meeting drives him to near madness. On the fourth day he is raging on the summit of his pillar, when there arrives an old man, a hermit, who has heard of the cause of his affliction, of his generous nature and lofty aspirations. The kind elderly man frees him from his chain and conveys him to a small bark below, while entirely insensible to what is passing around him. Laon learns later that the old man's eloquence has subdued his keepers, who have consented, at their own peril, to his escape. He is conveyed across the sea to a lonely island, where for seven years he is tended by this aged benefactor, whose kind and compassionate wisdom is sufficient to win back the mind of Laon to self-possession.

After Laon recovers, the old man tells him that during the years of his illness the cause of liberty slowly gained ground in the "Golden City", modelled on Constantinople, and that he himself would gladly assist in the Revolution which has now actually started there. The old man, however, considers himself too old and too subdued in his spirit and language to be an effective leader.

Laon accepts with eagerness the proposal of the old man and they depart in their bark for the revolutionised city. On their arrival they find the work apparently almost completed. An immense multitude of the people, men weary of political slavery and women sick of domestic abuse, are assembled in the fields outside the walls. Laon and his friend walk into the encampment and are received as friends. The host already acknowledged a leader and a presiding spirit in the person of a female, whom they reverence under the name of Laone. Laon and this heroine are attracted to each other by some unknown sympathy. The tones of her voice stir up all the depths of his spirit, but her countenance is veiled.

The palace of Othman is subsequently surrounded by the crowd, and entering it, Laon finds the tyrant sitting alone in his hall, deserted by all but one child, whose affection he has won by commendations and caresses.

The monarch is quietly removed from his palace with none following him but the child. On this consummation of their triumph, the multitude join in holding a high festival, of which Laone is the priestess.

Laon sits near her in her pyramid, but he is withheld, by a strange impulse, from speaking to her, and he retires to pass the night in repose at a distance from where she sleeps. At the break of day, Laone is awakened by sounds of tumults. The multitude, lately so firm and collected, are seen flying in every direction. He learns that the cause of their disarray is the arrival of a foreign army, sent by some of his brother princes to the relief of Othman. Laone, and a few of the more heroic spirits, withdraw to the side of a hill, where, ill-armed and outnumbered, they are slaughtered by their enemies. They take up their abode in a lonely retreat.

They remain for some time in this retreat, communicating to each other the long histories of their suffering. Cythna, according to her own wild tale, was carried away from Laon at the moment when he killed three of the captors that surrounded her, had been conveyed to the tyrant's palace, and had suffered all the insults, and almost all the injuries, to which its inmates were exposed. Her high spirit had, however, offended at last her oppressor, and she was sent to a Submarine cavern, or undersea cave, near the Symplegades, to which strange dungeon she was borne through the waves by a slave, "made dumb by poison, A Diver lean and strong, of Oman's coral sea."

In this dungeon, she was supplied with a daily pittance of food by an eagle, trained to hover over the only crevice through which the air had access to the captive. She sank into a melancholy frenzy and was aroused to consciousness by strange feelings which taught her to expect that she was about to be a mother. It is so, she gives birth, and for a while all the sorrows of her prison are soothed by the caresses of her child. But the child disappears suddenly and the bewildered mother half suspects that its existence has been but a dream of her madness. At last an earthquake changes the position of the cavern and Cythna is released by some passing mariners, who convey her to the city of Othman. The sailors are persuaded by her discourses during the voyage to take a part in the insurrection, which Cythna arrives in time to lead.

The merciless slaughter which followed the suppression of the revolt by the mercenary troops of the Tyrant's allies has led to a devastating plague accompanied by famine. The allies each invoke their separate Gods to relieve them of the pestilence, and resolve (at the suggestion of one "Iberian priest") to offer Cythna and Laon as a sacrifice to the deity; whoever locates them will receive the tyrant's daughter in marriage. It has been the custom of Laon to ride every night on the Tartar horse to procure food for Cythna. But now he leaves her. Shortly after a hooded figure appears in the tyrant's court, who offers to betray Laon to them if they will promise by God to transport Cythna safely to America, a "chainless child" (which Shelley hails as a nation of liberty, "There is a People mighty in its youth, A land beyond the Oceans of the West, Where, though with rudest rites, Freedom and Truth Are worshipped."). When they comply, he unmasks, revealing Laon himself ("And [he] smiled in gentle pride and said, 'lo, I am he!'"). Laon is sentenced to death at the stake. At the last moment, Cythna rides up on the tartar horse to come and share his fate. Both are burned alive at the stake. Laon climbs the funeral pile or pyre: "I, Laon, led by mutes, ascend my bier of fire, and look around." "A Shape of light is sitting by his side, A child most beautiful. In the midst appears Laon, exempt alone from mortal hopes and fears." Finally, Laon and Cythna undergo a miraculous transformation. In the final scenes, their spiritual odyssey of transmogrification is recounted.

== Influence ==
The poem was the subject of discussion and analysis during the Arab Spring that began in the early 2010s. David Womersley in "Shelley's Arab Spring" in the May, 2011 issue of Standpoint argued that Shelley's poem was an influence on the Arab Spring movement that emerged in North Africa and spread to the Middle East, beginning in 2010 in Tunisia. Pietro Deandrea argued that the poem had "continuing relevance for the sustenance of hope amongst contemporary progressive movements" and that it "focuses on the strategies to re-kindle hope and utopian visions that Shelley’s imagery hints at, and relates them to some aspects of the Arab Springs."
