= Old Copse, Beenham =

Scientific research site in Berkshire

- Site of Special Scientific Interest
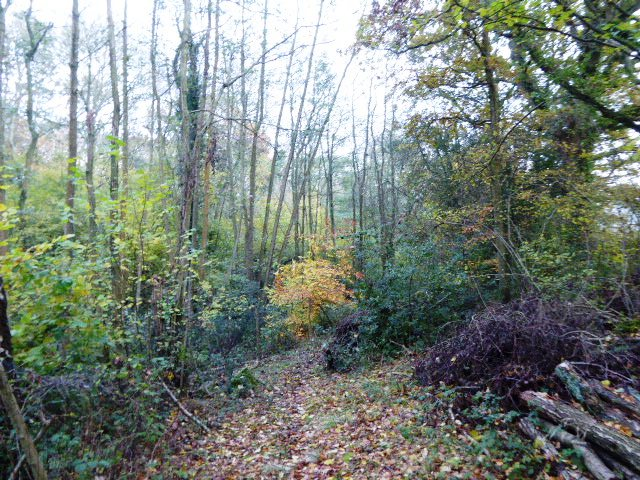

- Location within Berkshire
- Location of Old Copse, Beenham.
- Area of search: Berkshire
- Grid reference: SU 588 684
- Coordinates: 51.412°N 1.156°W
- Interest: Biological
- Area: 8.0 hectares (20 acres)
- Notification date: 1984
- Location map: Magic Map

Old Copse, Beenham is an 8-hectare (20-acre) biological Site of Special Scientific Interest south of Beenham in Berkshire. The site is private land with no public access.

== Geography ==
The coppice woodland is on London Clay situated on the north side of the Kennet valley. The site is on gently sloping ground, with damp to poorly-drained wet clay soils. A few small streams with associated wet flushes arise in the wood.

== History ==
The copse is classed as ancient woodland having been there for at least from 1600 and still retains tree and shrub cover which has not obviously been planted.

In 1984 the site was registered as a Site of Special Scientific Interest.

== Flora ==
The site has the following Flora:

=== Trees ===
- Oak
- Hazel
- Ash
- Ulmus glabra
- Alder
- Prunus avium
- Maple
- Birch
- Salix caprea
- Ilex aquifolium
- Viburnum opulus
- Sambucus nigra
- Cornus sanguinea

=== Plants ===
- Narcissus pseudonarcissus
- Carex strigosa
- Hylotelephium telephium
- Hyacinthoides non-scripta
- Anemone nemorosa
- Mercurialis perennis
- Primula vulgaris
- Equisetum telmateia
- Chrysosplenium oppositifolium
- Ranunculus flammula
