= Pincent's Kiln =

Site of Special Scientific Interest near Reading in the English county of Berkshire

- Site of Special Scientific Interest
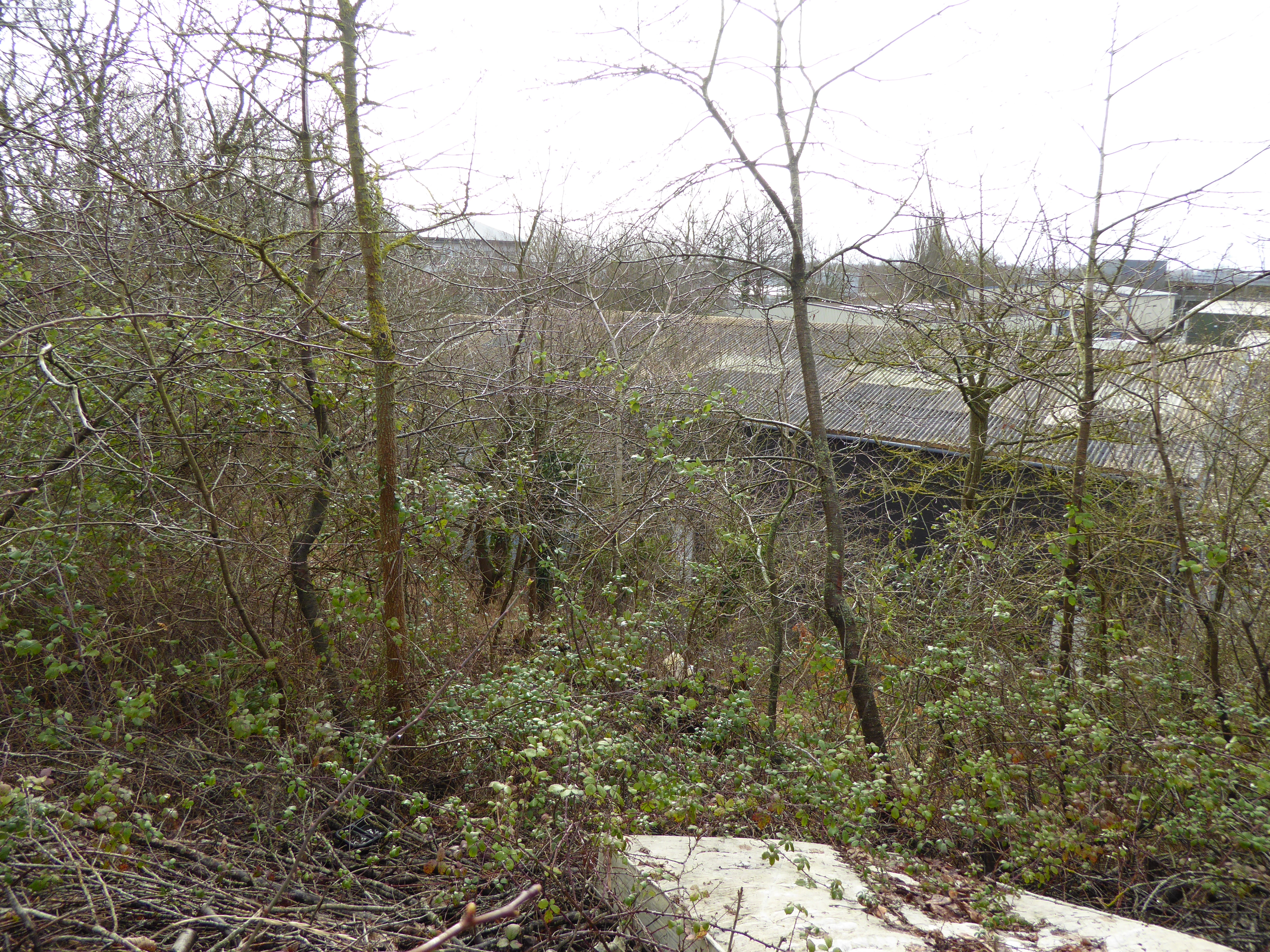

- Location within Berkshire
- Location of Pincent's Kiln.
- Area of search: Berkshire
- Grid reference: SU 650 719
- Coordinates: 51.442°N 1.066°W
- Interest: Geological
- Area: 0.2 hectares (0.49 acres)
- Notification date: 1985
- Location map: Magic Map

Pincent's Kiln is a 0.2-hectare (0.49-acre) geological Site of Special Scientific Interest situated between Theale and Calcot, on the western edge of the built-up area of Reading in the English county of Berkshire. It is a Geological Conservation Review site.

The site is a former Quarry which reveals important geological features It is the only remaining permanent exposure of the Tertiary Reading Beds in the area from which they were first described. The site provides evidence that a shallow sea spread over this area some 60 million years ago. The site contains a number of fossil flora of higher plants, with a number of species of fossil fruits and seeds.

The site is private land with no public access, forming the northern and eastern boundaries of the Pincents Kiln Industrial Park, and the western boundary of the headquarters of the Royal Berkshire Fire and Rescue Service. It lies within the civil parish of Tilehurst Without, which is in the area of the unitary authority of West Berkshire and the ceremonial county of Berkshire.
