= Frilsham =

Coordinates: 51.454°N 1.215°W

- Village
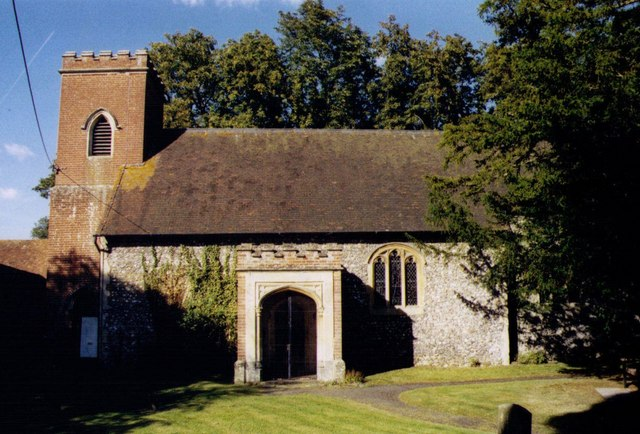
- St Frideswide Church, Frilsham

- Location within Berkshire
- Area: 4.91 km^{2} (1.90 sq mi)
- Population: 315 (2011 census)
  - Density: 64/km^{2} (170/sq mi)
- Civil parish: Frilsham
- Unitary authority: West Berkshire
- Ceremonial county: Berkshire
- Region: South East
- Country: England
- Sovereign state: United Kingdom
- Post town: Thatcham
- Postcode district: RG18
- Police: Thames Valley
- Fire: Royal Berkshire
- Ambulance: South Central
- UK Parliament: Newbury

Frilsham is a village and civil parish 4 miles (6.4 km) from Newbury, in the English county of Berkshire.

== Geography ==
Frilsham is near the Berkshire Downs, with the M4 to the north. The nucleated village is on a hill, with the parish church of St Widefride at its centre, surrounded by woods and meadows. The village overlooks the small valley formed by the upper Pang (or Pang Bourne) which runs from north to south through the parish. One of the woods, Coombe Wood is listed as a Site of Special Scientific Interest (SSSI).

== History ==
=== Manor ===
The manor was held of Edward the Confessor by two free men, two decades later on the Domesday Survey it was owned by Henry de Ferrers. His son was elevated to an earl, Earl Ferrers, and the overlordship continued in the hands of his descendants until the 13th century. it is recorded as held of the fee of the Earl of Derby's eldest son, Earl Ferrers. The rebel Robert de Ferrers led an insurrection in 1263 and was three years later deprived of his earldom and estates, which were then granted to Edmund Crouchback, the king's son. In consequence this overlordship followed the descent of the earldom and duchy of Lancaster. Manorial court rolls for the year 1440–1 are in the archives of the Duchy.

Its various tenants include the related families of Sir Ralph Peche; such as in 1173, Walter de Rideware, in the 13th century, Sir Oliver d'Eincourt, Walter de Rideware, Sir Thomas Rideware, John Falconer of Thurcaston, and William Cotton. From 1372 this descent included: Hugh de Berwyk, Ralph Boteler, William Haute, John le Boteler, then by sale: Sir Edmund Hungerford, kt., and others purchasing land in this neighbourhood for John Norreys. He was the eldest son of William Norreys of Bray. His later namesake seems to have attached to his adjoining manor of Yattendon with which manor it afterwards passed until 1623, when, on the death of the Earl of Berkshire, Frilsham passed to his daughter, Elizabeth wife of Edward Wray. It passed to her second husband, the Earl of Lindsey then to James Bertie, her eldest son by her second husband, who was created Baron Norreys of Rycote in 1675 and Earl of Abingdon in 1682.

It remained in this line until sold to 'Sir George Cornewall', born Sir George Amyand a leading Whig of London. In 1800 Sir George sold this manor to Mr. Hayward who left it to a relation Robert Floyd on his 1818 death. His family long after were the official patrons of the parish church. His daughter-in-law sold it, in 1903, to Henry Frederick George Weber, previously of Bucklebury, It was then sold, in 1907, to Sir Cameron Gull, of Frilsham House, the other major home and estate in the parish, who thus enhanced his local monopoly on the parish's agriculture land.

=== Economic history ===
The chief crops in the 1920s were wheat, barley and oats. The soil is chalk near the river, but there are beds of clay and sand at the eastern side of the parish. Frilsham Common was inclosed in 1857. The population was at that time purely agricultural. Aside from the varied elevations an aesthetic point made was of the chestnut trees in the north of the church yard by gazetteer compilers in the 1920s.

The presence of a watermill is mentioned in the Domesday Book. The current mill building is now converted into private accommodation.

== Landmarks ==
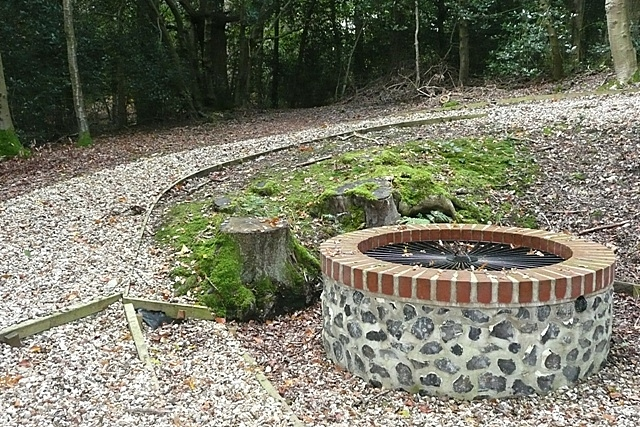
St Frideswide's Well

- St Frideswide church dates back to the 12th century with additions in the 15th and 17th century. The tower was added in 1837. The church is a Grade II* listed building.
- St Frideswide's Well. Just off one of the footpaths in the woods, formerly the common.
- The Club Room with a football pitch and children's playground.
- Telephone box, now housing the village defibrillator.
- Three farmhouses in the parish are Grade II listed buildings, Birch Farm, which dates to the late 16th century; Parsonage Farm, which dates to the 17th century; and Magpie Farm, which dates to the early 16th century.

== Demography ==
2011 Published Statistics: Population, home ownership and extracts from Physical Environment, surveyed in 2005
Output area	Homes owned outright	Owned with a loan	Socially rented	Privately rented	Other	km^{2} roads	km^{2} water	km^{2} domestic gardens	Usual residents	km^{2}
Civil parish	36	40	14	28	9	0.163	0.021	0.166	315	4.91
