= Cannoncourt Farm Pit =

Protected area in Berkshire, England

- Site of Special Scientific Interest
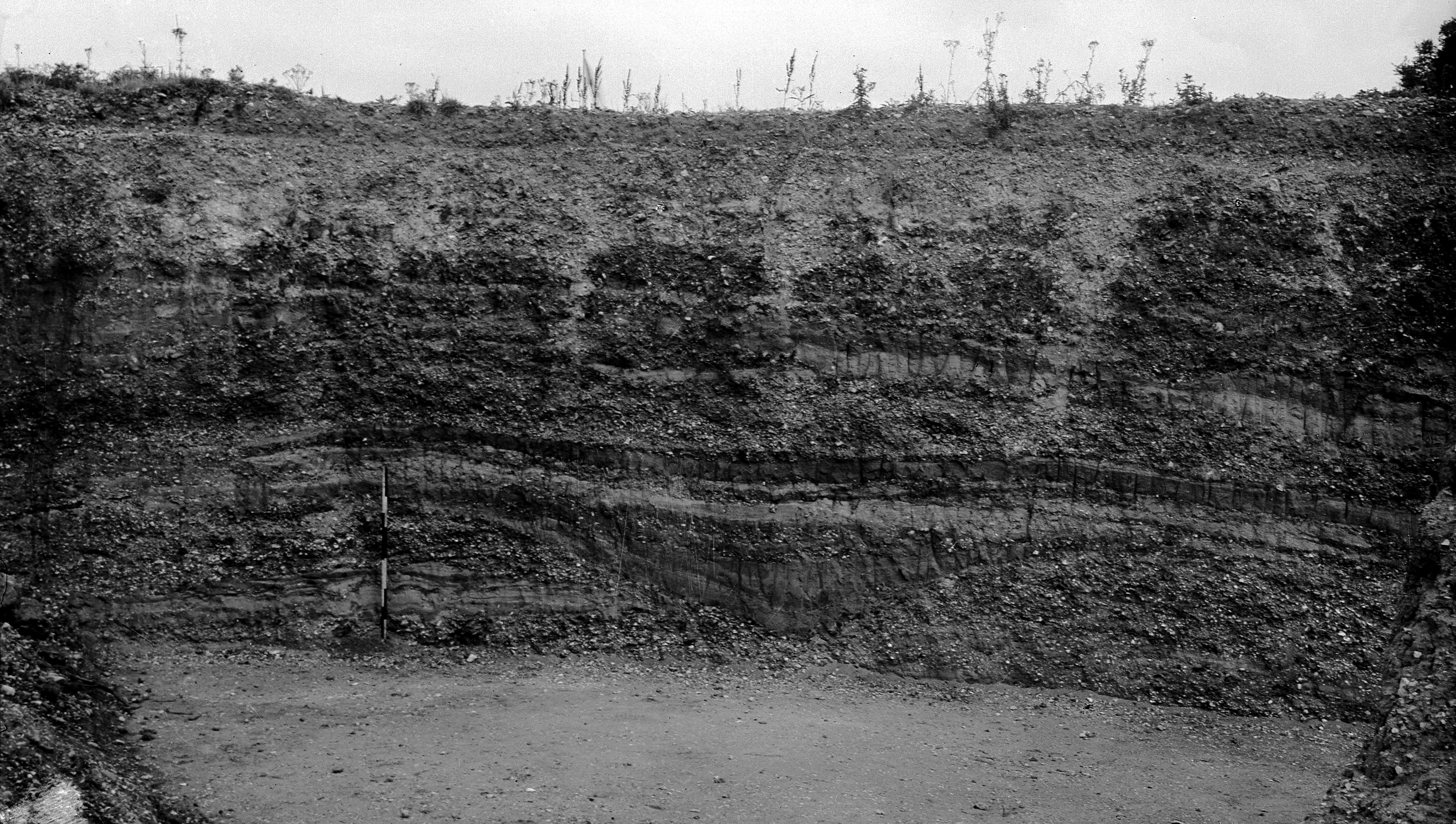

- Location within Berkshire
- Location of Cannoncourt Farm Pit.
- Area of search: Berkshire
- Grid reference: SU 877 830
- Coordinates: 51.539°N 0.737°W
- Interest: Geological
- Area: 0.3 hectares (0.74 acres)
- Notification date: 1987
- Location map: Magic Map

Cannoncourt Farm Pit is a 0.3-hectare (0.74-acre) geological Site of Special Scientific Interest in Maidenhead in Berkshire. It is a Geological Conservation Review site.

In the early twentieth century, these gravel pits yielded many Paleolithic tools of the Acheulian and Levallois industries, associated with the Neanderthals, including the largest hand axe ever found. The site is in the Lynch Hill Terrace of the River Thames, dating to the Wolstonian Stage between 350 and 200,000 years ago.

The pits have long ago been filled in and are now under a path and open ground in northern Maidenhead.
