= Inkpen Common SSSI =

Protected area in Berkshire, England

Inkpen Common
- Site of Special Scientific Interest
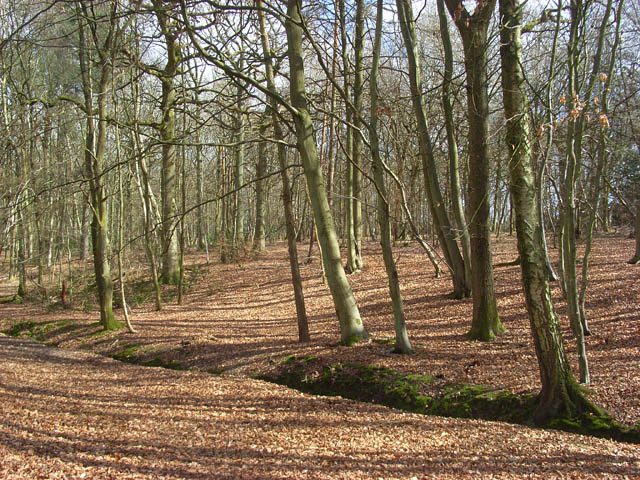

- Location within Berkshire
- Location of Inkpen Common.
- Area of search: Berkshire
- Grid reference: SU 381 641
- Coordinates: 51.375°N 1.454°W
- Interest: Biological
- Area: 12.8 hectares (32 acres)
- Notification date: 1983
- Location map: Magic Map

Inkpen Common or Inkpen Great Common is a 12.8-hectare (32-acre) biological Site of Special Scientific Interest east of Inkpen in Berkshire. It is managed as a nature reserve by the Berkshire, Buckinghamshire and Oxfordshire Wildlife Trust.

This is a surviving fragment of the former Inkpen Common is located between the hamlets of Hell Corner and Inkpen Common. It is mainly damp heathland, with small areas of marsh, woods and bracken. Flora on the heath include purple moor grass, common gorse, lousewort, lesser dodder and the only surviving colony in Berkshire of pale heath violet.
