= Beenham =

Coordinates: 51°24′59″N 1°08′52″W

- Village and civil parish
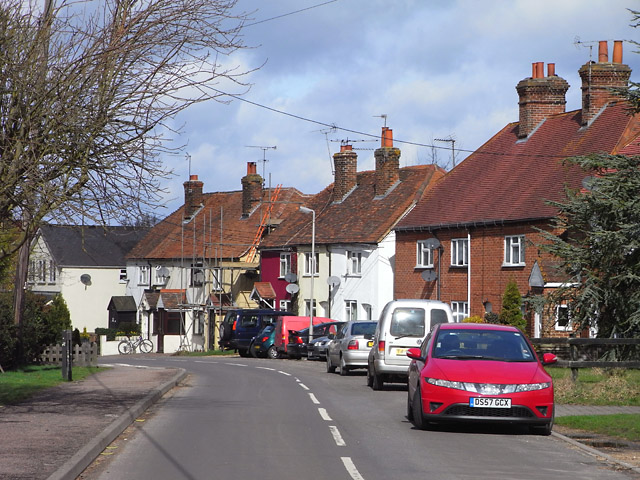
- Picklepythe Lane

- Location within Berkshire
- Area: 8.05 km^{2} (3.11 sq mi)
- Population: 459 (2011 census)
  - Density: 57/km^{2} (150/sq mi)
- OS grid reference: SU5868
- Civil parish: Beenham
- Unitary authority: West Berkshire
- Ceremonial county: Berkshire
- Region: South East
- Country: England
- Sovereign state: United Kingdom
- Post town: Reading
- Postcode district: RG7
- Dialling code: 0118
- Police: Thames Valley
- Fire: Royal Berkshire
- Ambulance: South Central
- Website: Beenham Online

Beenham is a village and civil parish centred 6 miles (9.7 km) east of Newbury in the West Berkshire district of Berkshire, England.

== Geography ==
Beenham is 2 miles (3.2 km) north of Aldermaston. The Old Copse is a woodland within the village that is a Site of Special Scientific Interest.

== History ==
=== Church history ===
The history of the Church of England parish church of Saint Mary begins in about the end of the 12th century. An old print of the original building shows that it had some 13th century lancet windows and a 16th-century window. In 1794 the church was struck by lightning and burnt down and was replaced with a Georgian building of brick. In 1859 the nave was demolished and replaced by one in the Gothic Revival style designed by the architect Henry Woodyer. The 1794 brick bell tower was retained and has a peal of six bells. The church is a Grade II* listed building.

=== 19th century summary ===
The following is an extract from the 1870s gazetteer of the British Isles.

"Beenham, or Beenham-Vallence, a parish...adjacent to the Kennet and Avon canal and to the Berks and Hants Railway, 1 ¼. mile N of Aldermaston station, and 8½ WSW of Reading. It has a post office...Acres, 1,890. Real property, £2,548. Pop., 505. Houses, 105. The property is much subdivided. Beenham House and Beenham Lodge are chief residences. The living is a vicarage in the diocese of Oxford. Value, £250. Patron, Mrs. Bushnell. The church was chiefly rebuilt in 1860. There are a Primitive Methodist chapel and a National School. Stackhouse, the author of the "History of the Bible," was [its] vicar."

However, the suffix, Valence, is erroneous and was mistakenly transferred from the manor surrounding Benham Park.

=== 1960s murderer ===
In October 1966 children's nanny Yolande Waddington, age 17, was found dead having been stabbed and strangled in Beenham. Less than six months later, two nine-year-old girls, Jeanette Wigmore and Jacqueline Williams, were found murdered at a local gravel pit. David Burgess, of Beenham, was jailed for life in 1967 for the murder of the two girls and spent more than 25 years behind bars. Waddington's killer was not identified at the time. Burgess subsequently admitted to the crime but challenged the police to "prove it". Following advances in DNA profiling, in November 2011 the 64-year-old Burgess was re-arrested, and subsequently tried and convicted of her murder. He received his third life sentence with a minimum term of 27 years.

== Amenities ==
Beenham has a primary school catering for approximately 60 pupils aged 4 to 11. There is one pub in the village, the Six Bells. The UK Wolf Conservation Trust is based at Butlers Farm, Beenham, the wolves can be heard howling within a three-mile radius.

== Transport ==
Bus routes 41 and 44 connect the village with Thatcham and Calcot.

== Demography ==
2011 Published Statistics: Population, home ownership and extracts from Physical Environment, surveyed in 2005
Output area	Homes owned outright	Owned with a loan	Socially rented	Privately rented	Other	km^{2} roads	km^{2} water	km^{2} domestic gardens	Usual residents	km^{2}
Civil parish	51	47	48	33	4	0.08	0.0001	0.13	459	8.05

== See also ==
- List of civil parishes in Berkshire
- List of places in Berkshire

== Sources ==
- Page, William; Ditchfield, P.H., eds. (1923). Victoria County History: A History of the County of Berkshire, Volume 3. pp. 277–279.
- Pevsner, Nikolaus (1966). The Buildings of England: Berkshire. Harmondsworth: Penguin Books. pp. 85–86.
