= Bray Pennyroyal Field =

Protected area in Berkshire, England

- Site of Special Scientific Interest
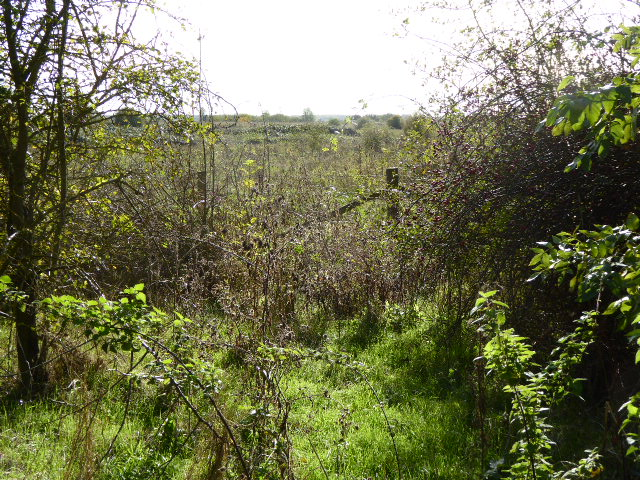

- Location within Berkshire
- Location of Bray Pennyroyal Field.
- Area of search: Berkshire
- Grid reference: SU 915 782
- Coordinates: 51.495°N 0.683°W
- Interest: Biological
- Area: 3.5 hectares (8.6 acres)
- Notification date: 1991
- Location map: Magic Map

Bray Pennyroyal Field is a 3.5-hectare (8.6-acre) biological Site of Special Scientific Interest between Windsor and Maidenhead in Berkshire.

This field is a filled in gravel pit next to the River Thames. It is the only site in the county for the nationally rare pennyroyal, which is listed in the British Red Data Book of vascular plants. The site is grazed by horses, a management regime which is thought to be beneficial to the plant.

The site is private land with no public access.
