= Swinley Park and Brick Pits =

Protected area in Berkshire, England

- Site of Special Scientific Interest
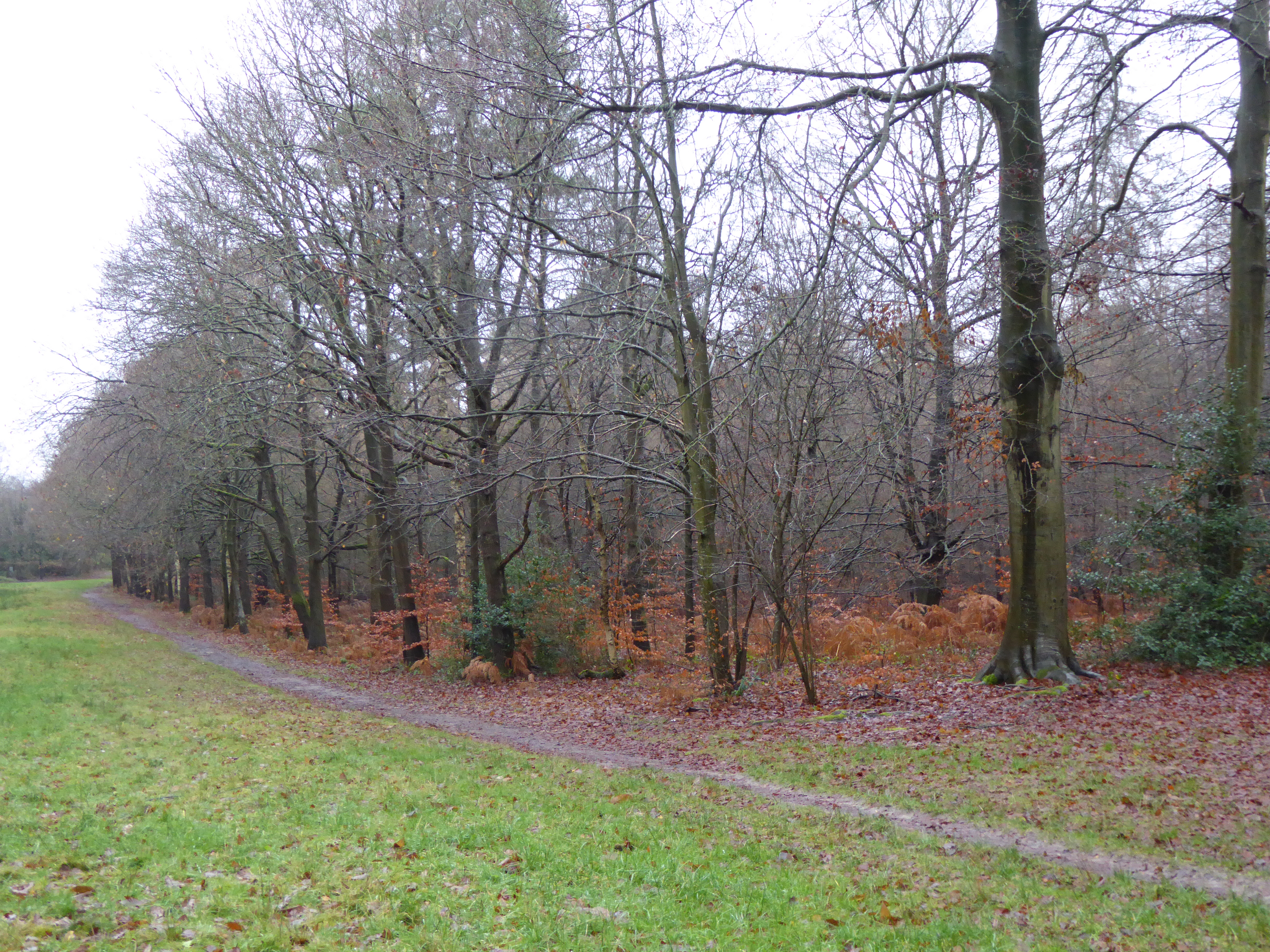

- Location within Berkshire
- Location of Swinley Park and Brick Pits.
- Area of search: Berkshire
- Grid reference: SU 896 673
- Coordinates: 51.398°N 0.713°W
- Interest: Biological
- Area: 88.7 hectares (219 acres)
- Notification date: 1983
- Location map: Magic Map

Swinley Park and Brick Pits is an 88.7-hectare (219-acre) biological Site of Special Scientific Interest east of Bracknell in Berkshire, United Kingdom. It is part of the Crown Estate.

The park is mainly a conifer plantation with scattered ancient oaks, sweet chestnuts and beech trees. Decaying trees have many rare species of insect. Swinley Brick Pits have several small pools which provide a habitat for dragonflies and waterfowl, as well as breeding sites for all three species of newts and a colony of marsh clubmoss.

There is access to the park from New Forest Ride.
