= Wasing Wood Ponds =

Protected area in Berkshire, England

- Site of Special Scientific Interest
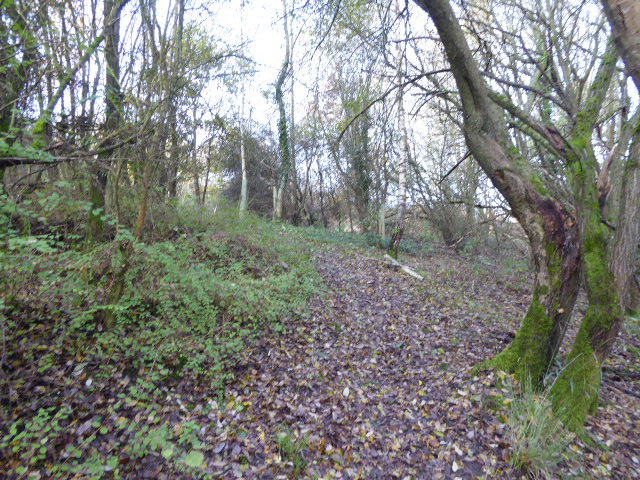

- Location within Berkshire
- Location of Wasing Wood Ponds.
- Area of search: Berkshire
- Grid reference: SU 580 633
- Coordinates: 51.366°N 1.168°W
- Interest: Biological
- Area: 13.5 hectares (33 acres)
- Notification date: 1984
- Location map: Magic Map

Wasing Wood Ponds is a 13.5-hectare (33-acre) biological Site of Special Scientific Interest south of Aldermaston in Berkshire.

The ponds are special for their range of Odonata.

== Geography ==
The site is a group of ponds, wet ditches and marshy areas partly in the Woods and partly on open ground formerly excavated for gravel.

It is in two different areas, which are private land, but a public footpath crosses one of them.

== Fauna ==
The site has the following animals

=== Invertebrates ===
- Cordulia aenea
- Brilliant emerald
- Sympetrum sanguineum
- Erythromma najas

== Flora ==
The site has the following Flora:

=== Trees ===
- Birch
