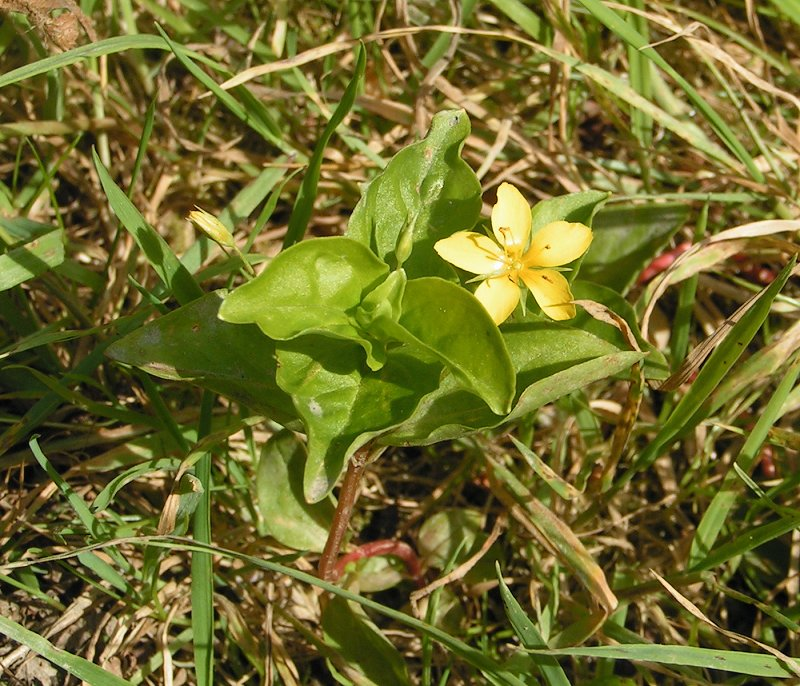

Scientific classification
- Kingdom: Plantae
- Clade: Embryophytes
- Clade: Tracheophytes
- Clade: Spermatophytes
- Clade: Angiosperms
- Clade: Eudicots
- Clade: Asterids
- Order: Ericales
- Family: Primulaceae
- Genus: Lysimachia
- Species: L. nemorum

Binomial name
- Lysimachia nemorum L.

Synonyms
- Anagallis nemorum (L.) Büscher & G.H.Loos; Ephemerum nemorum (L.) Rchb.; Lerouxia nemorum (L.) Mérat; Lysimachia azorica Hook.; Lysimachusa nemorum (L.) Pohl

= Lysimachia nemorum =

Yellow pimpernel

Species of flowering plant

Lysimachia nemorum, the yellow pimpernel, is a perennial flowering plant in the family Primulaceae.

== Description ==
Lysimachia nemorum is an evergreen creeping perennial herbaceous plant growing up to about 40 cm (16 in). The bright green leaves are opposite, ovate, pointed and without teeth or hairs. The yellow flowers are about 8mm across, borne singly on long stalks in the axil of each leaf. They have five very narrow sepals, five pointed petals and five stamens. The ovary is superior, forming a capsule.

== Distribution ==
Lysimachia nemorum is native to Great Britain and Ireland and the east of mainland Europe from the Pyrenees in the south to eastern Norway in the north. Its habitat is damp woodland.
