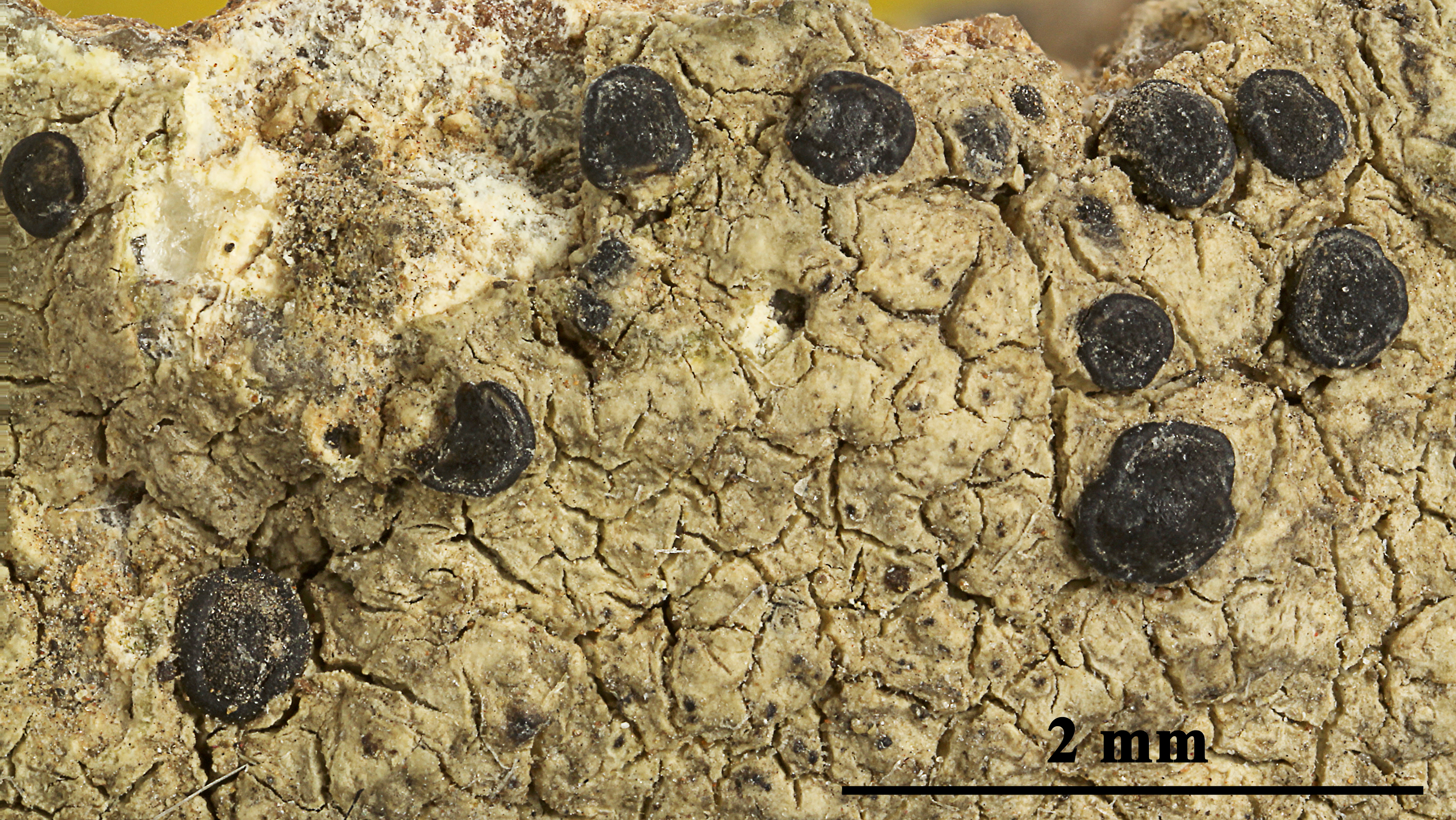

Scientific classification
- Kingdom: Fungi
- Division: Ascomycota
- Class: Lecanoromycetes
- Order: Caliciales
- Family: Caliciaceae
- Genus: Buellia
- Species: B. saxorum

Binomial name
- Buellia saxorum A.Massal. (1852)

Synonyms
- Lecidea saxorum (A.Massal.) Hepp (1860); Lecidea disciformis var. saxorum (A.Massal.) Wedd. (1875)

= Buellia saxorum =

Species of lichen

Buellia saxorum is a species of saxicolous (rock-dwelling) crustose lichen in the family Caliciaceae. It forms a moderately thick, white to pale yellow-grey crust with a network of fine cracks and a distinctive black border where it meets other lichen thalli, creating a mosaic pattern. The lichen's reproductive structures appear as small dark discs up to 1 mm in diameter on the surface of the thallus. First described by the Italian botanist Abramo Bartolommeo Massalongo in 1852, B. saxorum can be identified by its chemical spot test reactions due to the presence of atranorin and gyrophoric acid. It is found in several European countries including Britain, France, Italy, and Spain.

== Description ==
Buellia saxorum forms a moderately thick crust-like growth (thallus) on its substrate. The thallus has a distinctive appearance with a network of fine cracks (described as "rimose-cracked" in technical terminology) and displays a white to pale yellow-grey colouration. One of its distinctive features is the black border (prothallus) that clearly defines its edges, often creating a mosaic pattern where multiple thalli meet. When stained with iodine, the inner layer (medulla) turns blue.

The reproductive structures (apothecia) measure between 0.3 and 1 mm in diameter and sit on the surface of the thallus rather than being embedded within it. These apothecia have a flat to slightly convex dark disc surrounded by a prominent true rim (exciple). Under microscopic examination, the upper layer of the apothecia (epithecium) appears brown and does not react with nitric acid. The spore-producing layer (hymenium) lacks oil droplets.

The spores (ascospores) are divided by a single septum (internal partition) and measure 10–18 by 5–9 micrometres (μm). They have walls that are uniformly thickened and smooth. They are of the Physconia-type The asexual reproductive structures (pycnidia) are abundant, producing spindle to cylinder-shaped spores (conidia) that measure 4–7 (–9) by about 1 μm.

When subjected to chemical spot tests, the thallus is C+ (red), K+ (yellow), Pd (± yellow), and UV−. These reactions indicate the presence of two secondary metabolites: atranorin and gyrophoric acid. Lecanoric acid is present in trace amounts.

== Similar species ==
Buellia saxorum can be distinguished from related species by its characteristic moderately thick, rimose-cracked, white thallus with a prominent black prothallus, amyloid medulla (I+ blue), and chemical profile (C+ red, K+ yellow, containing atranorin and gyrophoric acid). Buellia flavescens differs from B. saxorum in having a yellowish-inspersed medulla and containing placodiolic acid rather than gyrophoric acid. While both species have a similar rimose to areolate thallus appearance and ascospore type (Physconia-type), B. flavescens gives a C+ deep yellow reaction instead of the C+ red seen in B. saxorum.

Buellia leptoclinoides can be distinguished by its rimose to bullate thallus, hymenium containing oil droplets, and ascospores with both median and lateral wall thickenings (Callispora-type). It also contains placodiolic acid but differs from B. flavescens in having a non-amyloid medulla (I-). Buellia subdisciformis, with which B. saxorum was historically confused, differs primarily in its chemistry (containing atranorin, norstictic acid, and connorstictic acid) and slightly different spore dimensions. Buellia dispersa has a similar appearance but can be differentiated by its more variable thallus morphology, and the absence of gyrophoric acid.

== Habitat and distribution ==
Buellia saxorum grows on more or less vertical faces of siliceous rocks. In Europe, it occurs in Britain, France, Italy, and Spain.

== See also ==
- List of Buellia species
