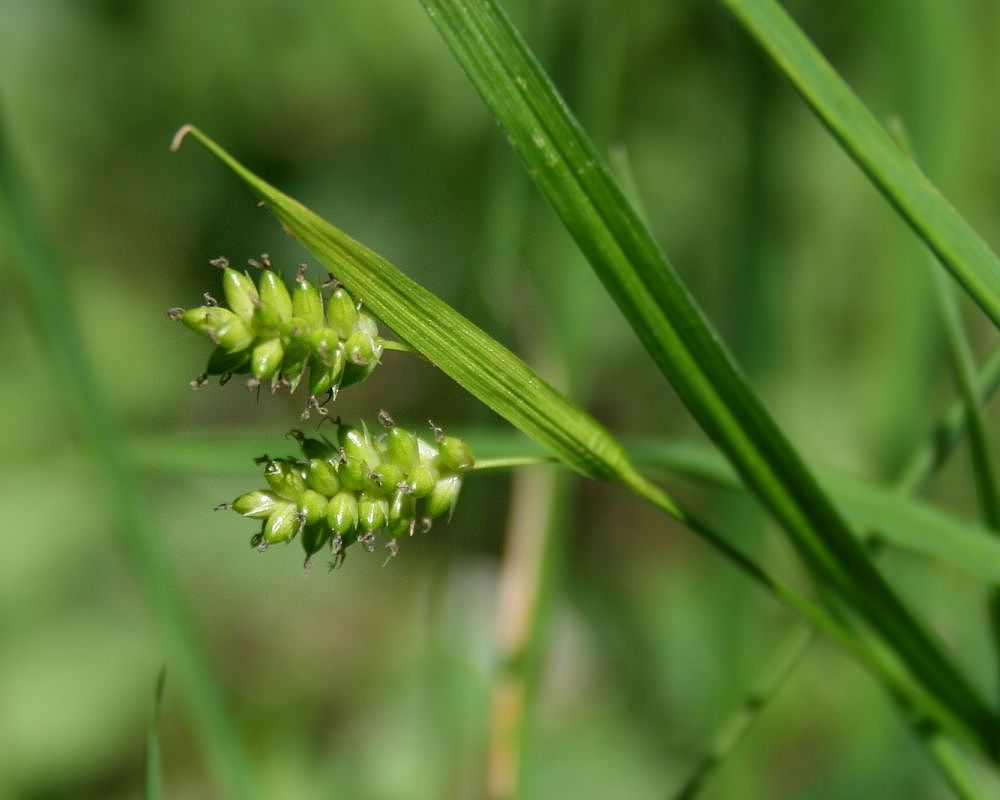
- Seedheads

Scientific classification
- Kingdom: Plantae
- Clade: Tracheophytes
- Clade: Angiosperms
- Clade: Monocots
- Clade: Commelinids
- Order: Poales
- Family: Cyperaceae
- Genus: Carex
- Species: C. pallescens

Binomial name
- Carex pallescens L.

Synonyms
- List: Carex chalcodeta V.I.Krecz.; Carex leucantha Schur; Carex microstoma Franch.; Carex pallescens var. chalcodeta (V.I.Krecz.) Ö.Nilsson; Carex pallescens var. neogaea Fernald; Carex pallescens var. undulata (Kunze) J.Carey; Carex pallida Salisb.; Carex tymphaea Formánek; Carex undulata Kunze; Trasus pallescens (L.) Gray

= Carex pallescens =

Species of flowering plant

Carex pallescens, called pale sedge, is a widespread species of flowering plant in the genus Carex, native to the northeastern United States, eastern Canada, Iceland, Europe, Tunisia, and western Asia. It has unstable chromosome numbers.
