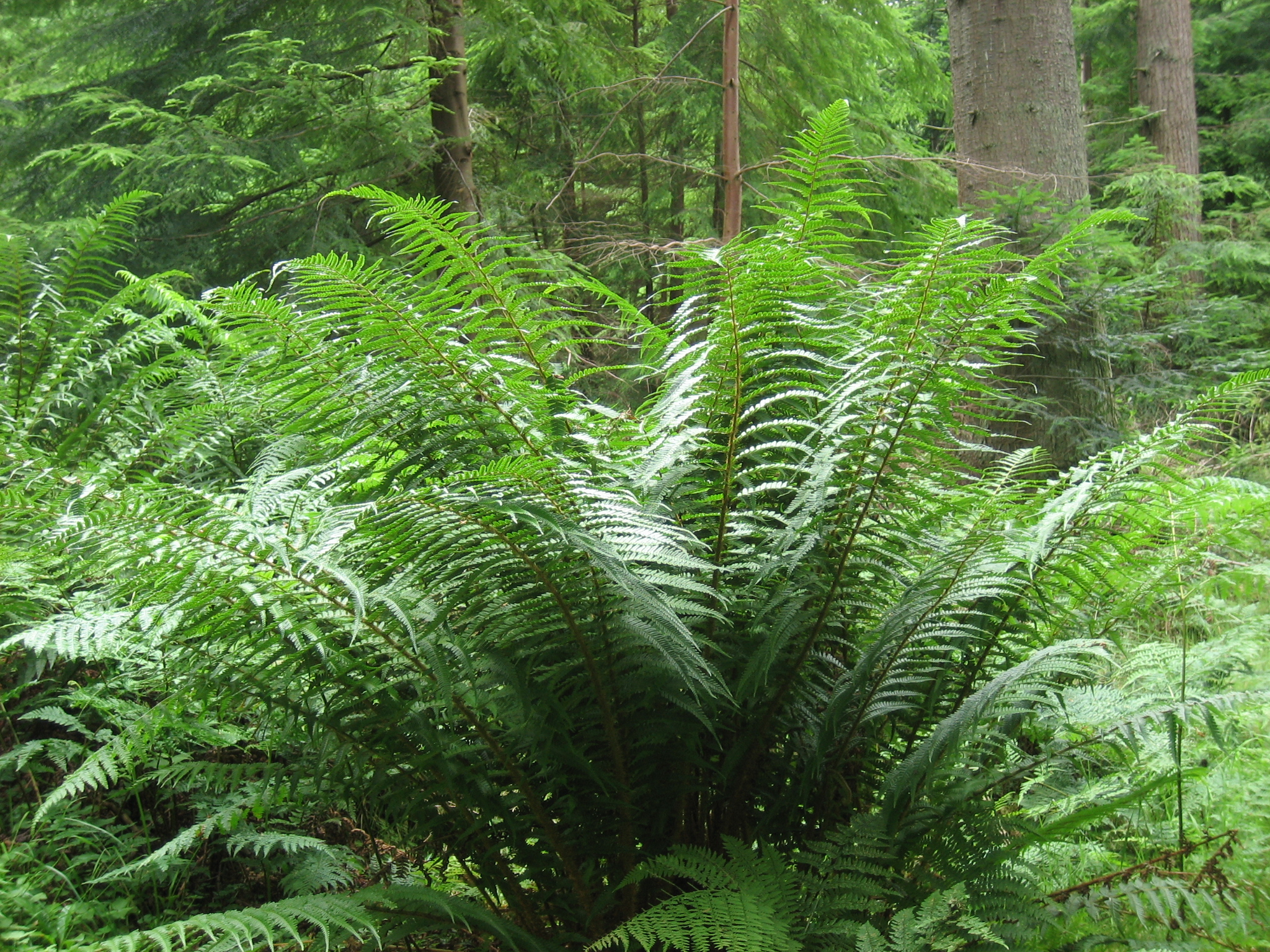

Scientific classification
- Kingdom: Plantae
- Clade: Embryophytes
- Clade: Tracheophytes
- Division: Polypodiophyta
- Class: Polypodiopsida
- Order: Polypodiales
- Suborder: Polypodiineae
- Family: Dryopteridaceae
- Genus: Dryopteris
- Species: D. affinis

Binomial name
- Dryopteris affinis (Lowe) Fraser-Jenk.

= Dryopteris affinis =

Species of fern

Dryopteris affinis, the scaly male fern or golden-scaled male fern, is a fern native to western and southern Europe and southwestern Asia. It is most abundant on moist soils in woodlands in areas with high humidity, such as the British Isles and western France. In the Mediterranean region and the Caucasus it is confined to high altitudes.

== Description ==
Dryopteris affinis is virtually evergreen and bears light green fronds 60–160 cm (24–63 in) long, moderately stiff and hard-textured, the rachis at the base of the frond densely covered in yellow-brown scales known as ramenta. The frond is bipinnate, the pinnae up to 8–18 cm (3–7 in) long, the pinnules broad rectangular with the margin most toothed close to the pinna tip. There is a blackish spot at the base of the pinna where it joins the rachis.

Individual fronds live for about 1.5 years and remain attached to the rhizome after withering. D. affinis is closely related to Dryopteris filix-mas, distinguished by its usually more robust habit with usually more evergreen fronds, more densely scaly frond stems, and more rectangular (less tapered and lobed) pinnae and pinnules.

It is one of the larger European native ferns, with older specimens developing a dense, almost tree fern-like base up to 20–30 cm (8–12 in) high and 30–40 cm (12–16 in) broad.

== Cultivation ==
Numerous cultivars and varieties have been selected for garden use, of which the following have gained the Royal Horticultural Society's Award of Garden Merit:

- D. affinis
- 'Polydactyla Mapplebeck'
- 'Crispa Gracilis'
- 'Cristata'
- 'Cristata Angustata'
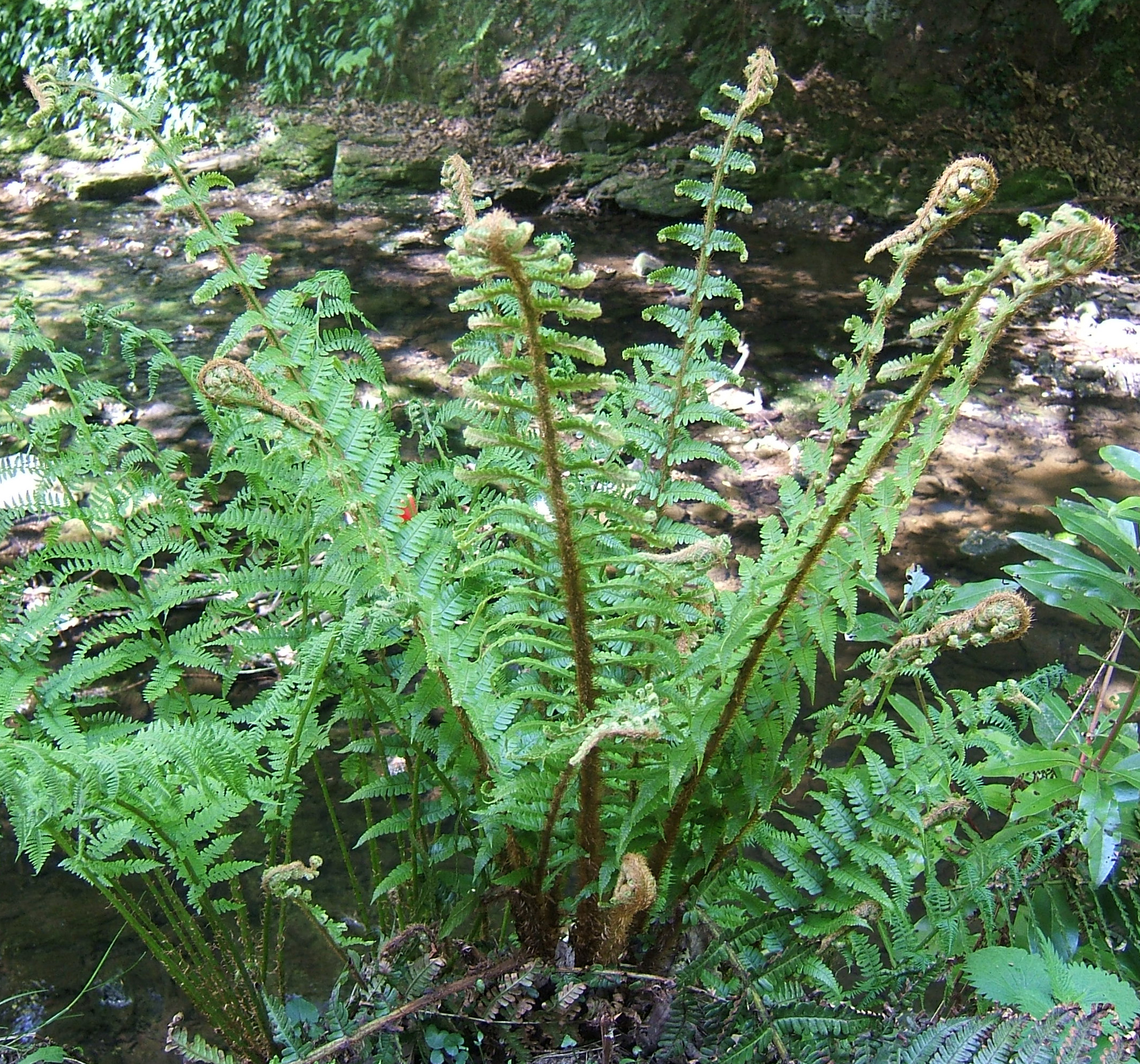
Young fronds in spring

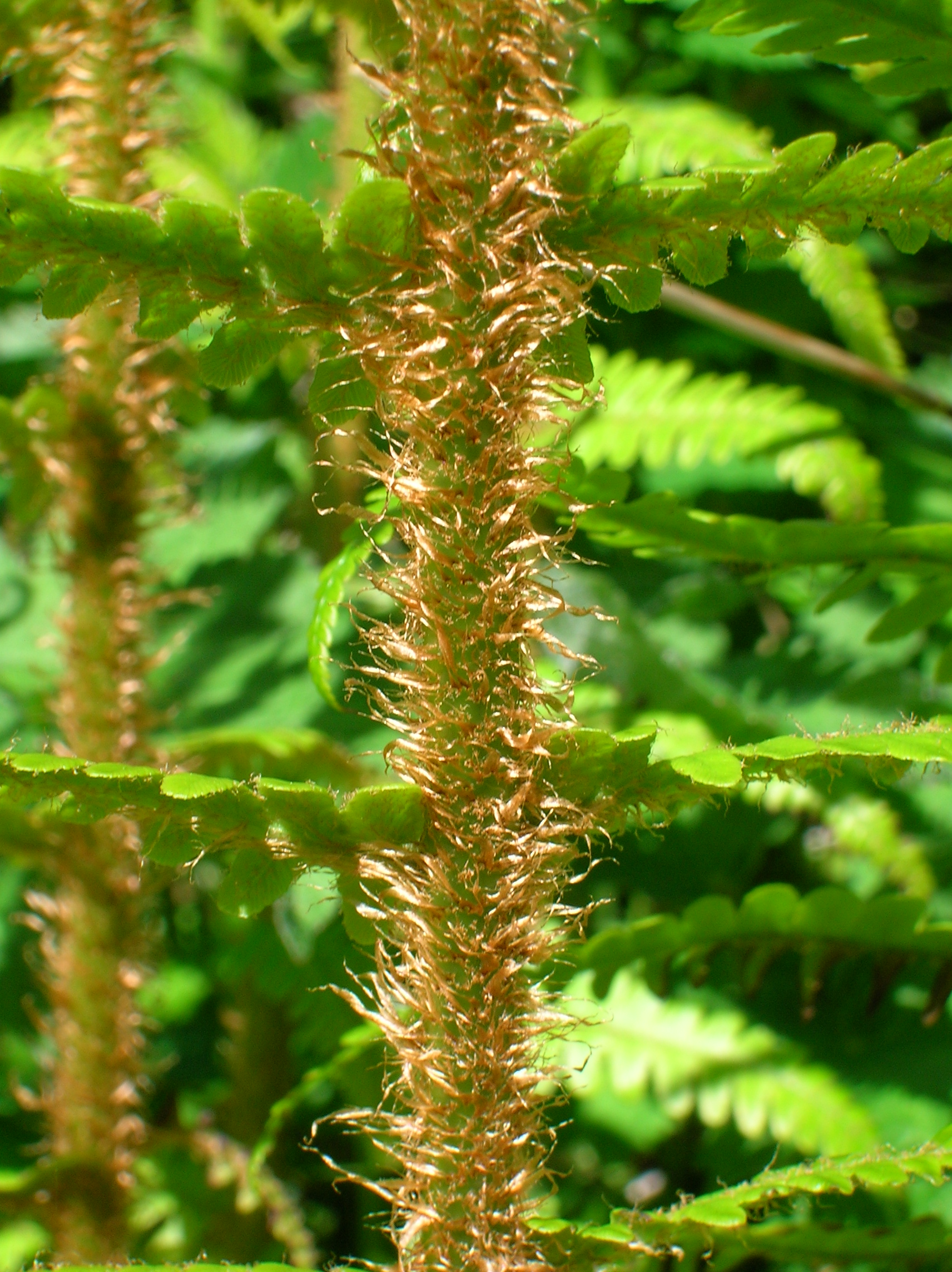
Ramenta on the fern's rachis

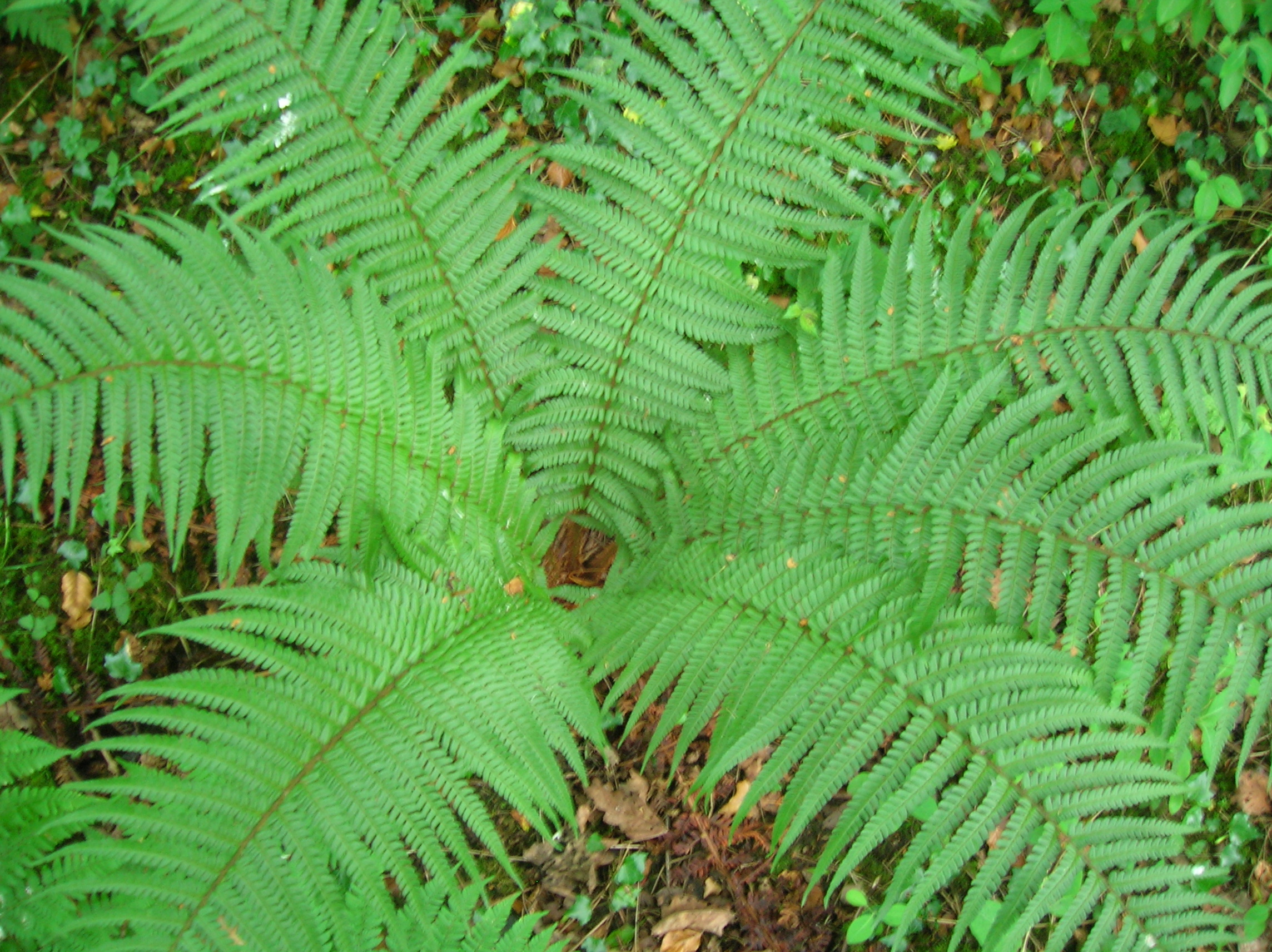
'Shuttlecock' form of growth
