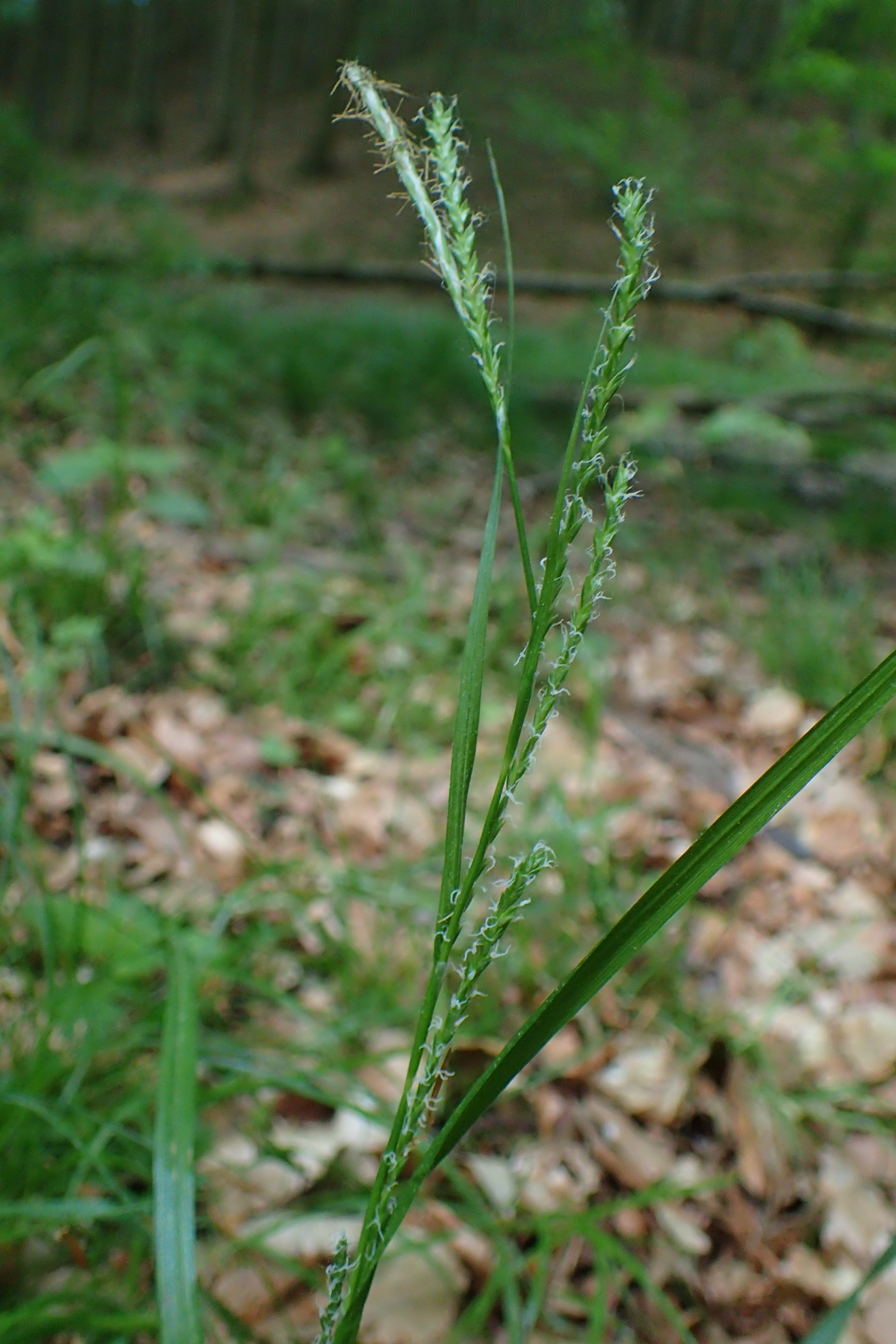
- Inflorescences

Scientific classification
- Kingdom: Plantae
- Clade: Tracheophytes
- Clade: Angiosperms
- Clade: Monocots
- Clade: Commelinids
- Order: Poales
- Family: Cyperaceae
- Genus: Carex
- Species: C. strigosa

Binomial name
- Carex strigosa Huds.

Synonyms
- List: Carex godefrinii Willemet; Carex leptostachya Boiss.; Carex leptostachys Ehrh. ex L.f.; Loxotrema leptostachys (Ehrh. ex L.f.) Raf.; Trasus strigosus (Huds.) Gray

= Carex strigosa =

Species of grass-like plant

Carex strigosa, the thin-spiked wood sedge, is a species of flowering plant in the genus Carex, native to Europe and the Caucasus region. Its diploid chromosome number is 2n=66.
