= St Mary Abbots =

Church in Kensington, London, England

Coordinates: 51°30′08″N 0°11′30″W

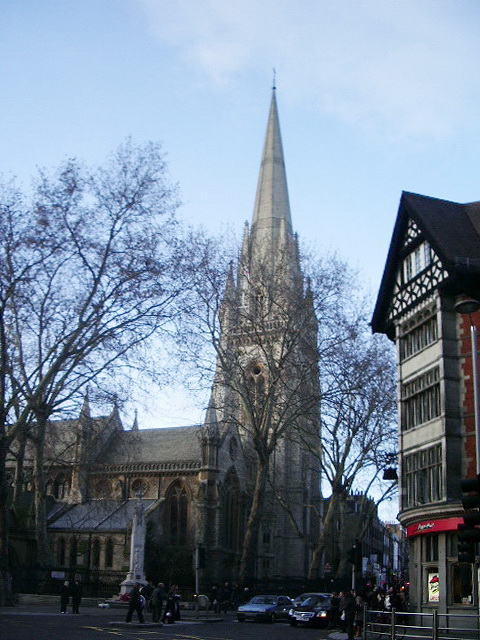
- St Mary Abbots Church in 2007
- St Mary Abbots
- OS grid reference: TQ 25605 79707
- Location: Kensington Church Street, Kensington, London W8 4LA
- Country: England
- Denomination: Church of England
- Churchmanship: High Church
- Website: stmaryabbotschurch.org

History
- Status: Parish church
- Consecrated: 1262

Architecture
- Functional status: Active
- Heritage designation: Grade II*
- Architect: Sir George Gilbert Scott
- Style: Neo-Gothic
- Completed: 1872

Specifications
- Capacity: 700
- Length: 179 feet (55m)
- Width: 109 feet (34m)

Administration
- Province: Canterbury
- Diocese: London
- Archdeaconry: Middlesex
- Deanery: Kensington
- Parish: Kensington

Clergy
- Bishop: Emma Ineson
- Vicar: Emma Dinwiddy Smith

St Mary Abbots is a Church of England church located on Kensington High Street and the corner of Kensington Church Street in London W8.

The present church structure was built in 1872 to the designs of Sir George Gilbert Scott, who combined neo-Gothic and early-English styles. This edifice remains noted for having the tallest spire in London and is the latest in a series on the site since the beginning of the 12th century.

The church, and its railings, are listed at Grade II* on the National Heritage List for England.

== History ==
=== Foundation ===
Sir Aubrey de Vere was a Norman knight who was rewarded with the manor of Kensington, among other estates, after the successful Norman Conquest. Around 1100, his eldest son, Godfrey (great-uncle of Aubrey, 1st Earl of Oxford), was taken seriously ill and cared for by Faritius, abbot of the Benedictine Abbey of St Mary at Abingdon. After a period of remission, Godfrey de Vere died in 1106 aged about 19.

The de Vere family's gratitude to the abbey for their son's care was recognised by its bequest of 270 acres (1.1 km^{2}) of land. In 1262 the abbey founded a church and parish in Kensington, dedicated to St Mary. The epithet of Abbots is deemed to derive from its link with the ancient Abingdon Abbey rather than that subsequently with the diocese of the Bishop of London. However, this led to a dispute with the bishop and legal action followed in the diocesan consistory court. This resulted in the patronage of the church passing to the bishop in perpetuity but rights over the surrounding land remaining with the abbey. The succession of vicars is recorded in a direct line back to this foundation in 1262.

=== Rebuilds ===
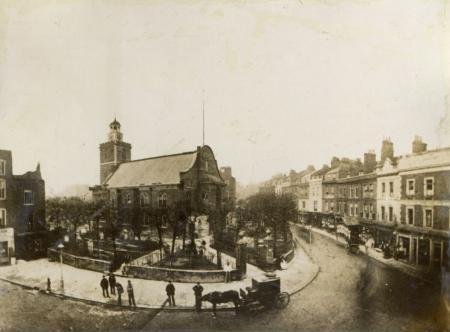
Old St Mary Abbots Church, in 1869, shortly before its demolition

In 1370 the Norman church was rebuilt.

When William III relocated the royal court to Kensington Palace in 1689 the area became fashionable rendering the medieval church too small, thus it was demolished at the end of the 17th century and replaced by a Late Renaissance-style building. This in turn proved too small as London urbanised in the 19th century.

Around 1860 the vicar, [John Sinclair], launched a campaign for the building of a striking new church. The architect George Gilbert Scott was engaged and recommended the demolition of the existing church to take advantage of the site at the road junction. St Mary Abbot's design is almost certainly influenced by Scott's earlier work on Dunblane Cathedral – its west front's tall window and carved tympanum are similar to those in the cathedral. The 278 ft (85 m) high spire is clearly influenced by that of St Mary Redcliffe, Bristol. The present church retains many fittings from the earlier churches, especially funeral monuments from the mid-17th century onwards.

In March 1944 fire-bombs caused significant damage at St Mary Abbots. The nave and chancel roof caved in, landing in the pews below, and there was some damage to some of the stained glass windows and the organ, however the main structure was not seriously harmed. The church was temporarily repaired to allow services to continue; and in February 1956 a service of thanksgiving was held in the church. The original Victorian pews still bear burn marks and repair patches from the fallen roof.

In 2000 the Friends of St Mary Abbots led a fundraising campaign to install lights outside the church to highlight the spire and outside of the building as part of the Millennium celebrations.

In 2023, as part of the 150th anniversary celebration, a permanent access ramp was added outside the South Door, the church spire was cleaned and restored and the lights updated and replaced.

== Bells ==
The tower holds a ring of ten bells hung for change ringing. Five of these bells – the fourth, fifth, sixth, eighth and ninth of the current ring – date from 1772 and were cast by Thomas Janaway. The other five – the treble, second, third, seventh and tenor – were cast in 1879 by John Warner & Sons. The five bells were funded through a donation by Phyllis Cunliffe (1890–1974), mother to coin designer Christopher Ironside.

== Primary school ==
The church has an associated primary school in its churchyard, founded in 1707 as a charity school. The school buildings were designed by Nicholas Hawksmoor in 1711, but demolished in the 1870s to make way for a town hall. The present buildings date from 1875 and are notable for the painted stone statues by Thomas Eustace of a boy and girl, dating from about 1715, now on the north face of the school; its playgrounds intersperse with the churchyard, and the school maintains close links with the Church of England.

== Notable people ==
=== Notable clergy ===
- Canon Donald Allchin, theologian, served his curacy here from 1956 to 1960

=== Notable parishioners ===
- Joseph Addison
- David Cameron
- George Canning
- Tennessee Claflin (married Sir Francis Cook, 1st Baronet at the church in 1885)
- Alec Clifton-Taylor
- Edmund Fanning
- Michael Gove
- Adrian Hardy Haworth
- P. D. James
- John Lockwood Kipling and Alice Kipling (parents of Rudyard Kipling, married at the church in 1865)
- Thomas Babington Macaulay
- Sir Isaac Newton (commemorated by a window in the north transept)
- Beatrix Potter (married William Heelis at the church in October 1913)
- William Thackeray
- William Wilberforce
- Diana, Princess of Wales (in 1997 the church became a focus for mourners)

== Gallery ==
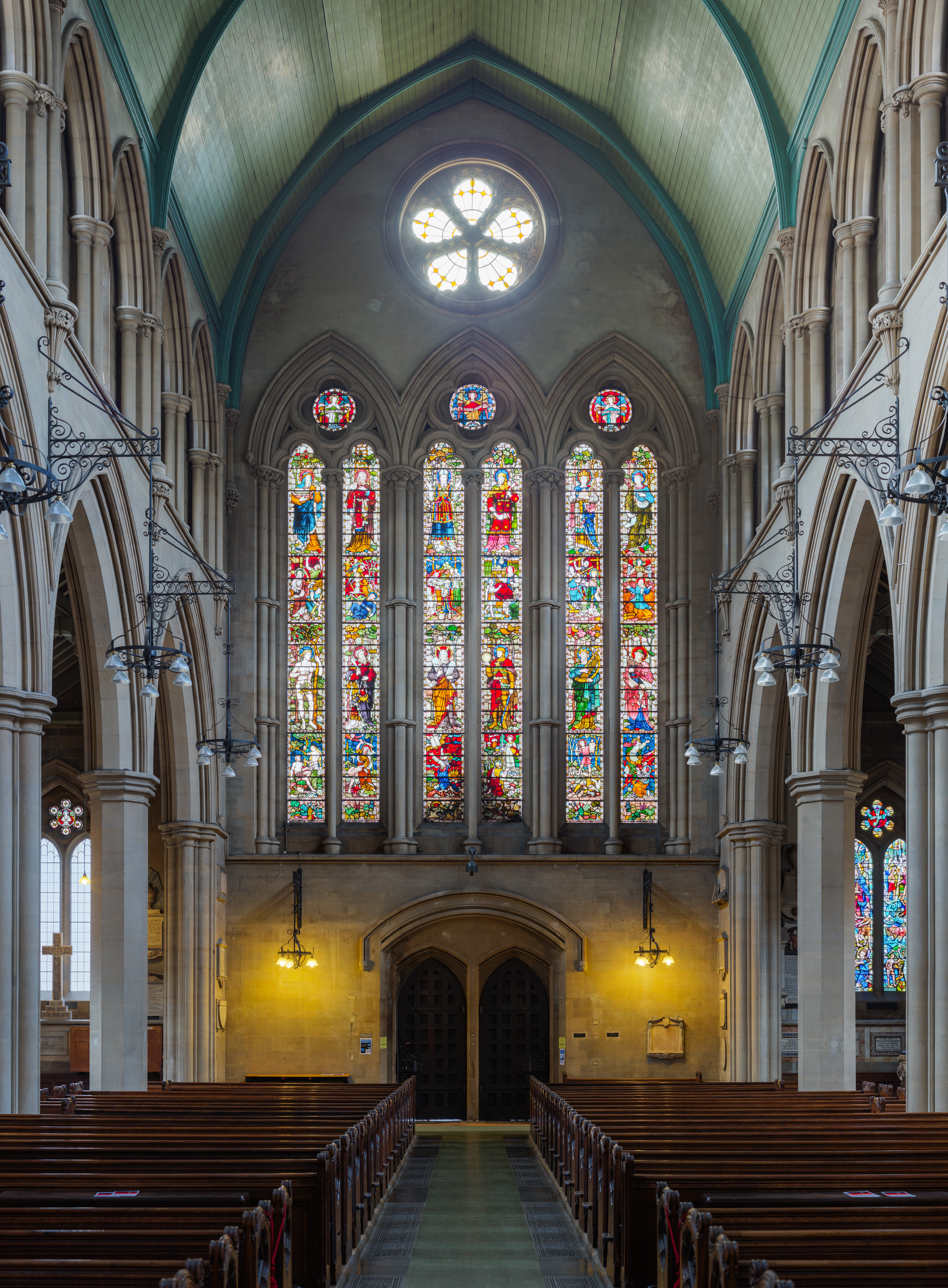
West stained-glass window

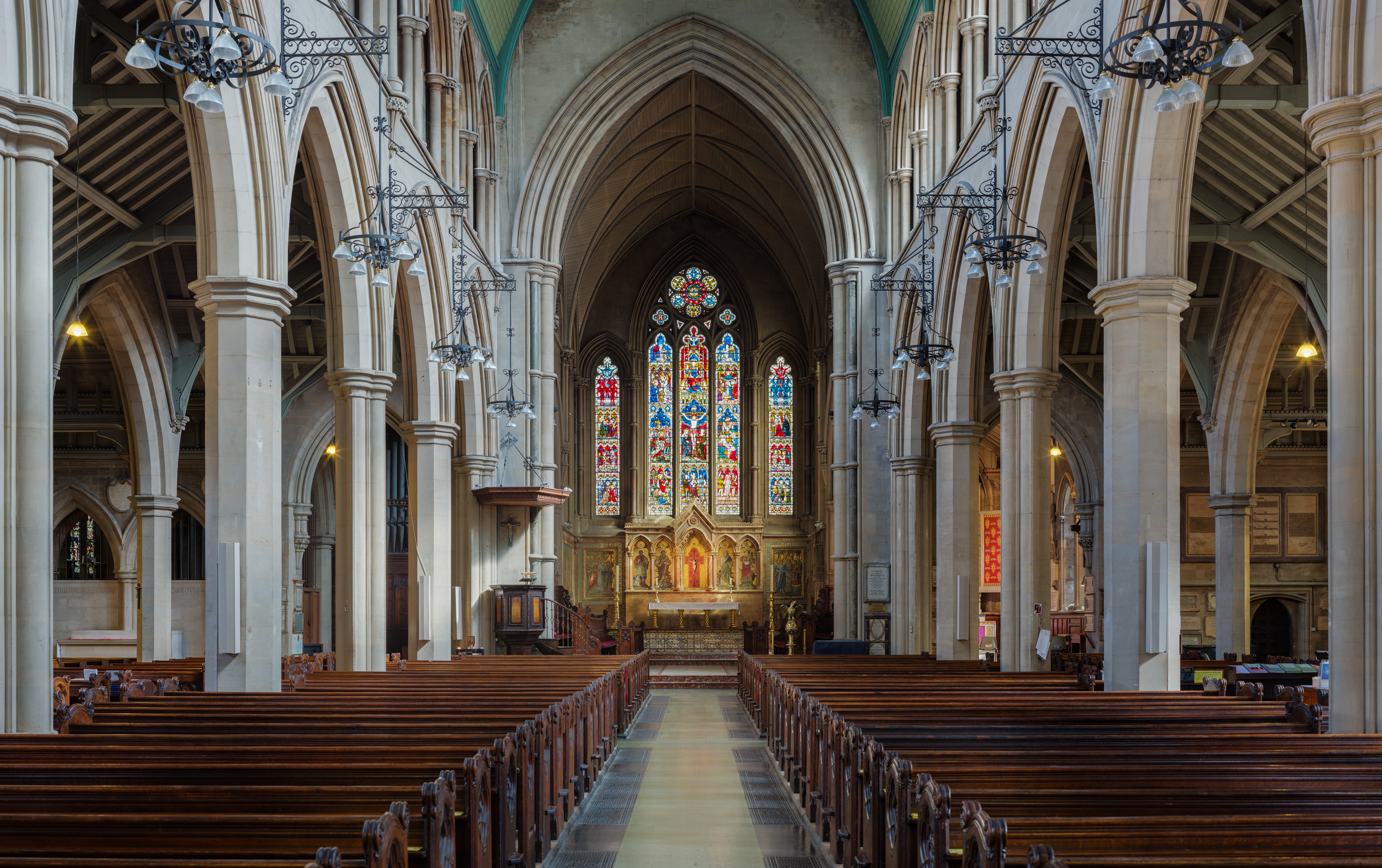
Altar and nave

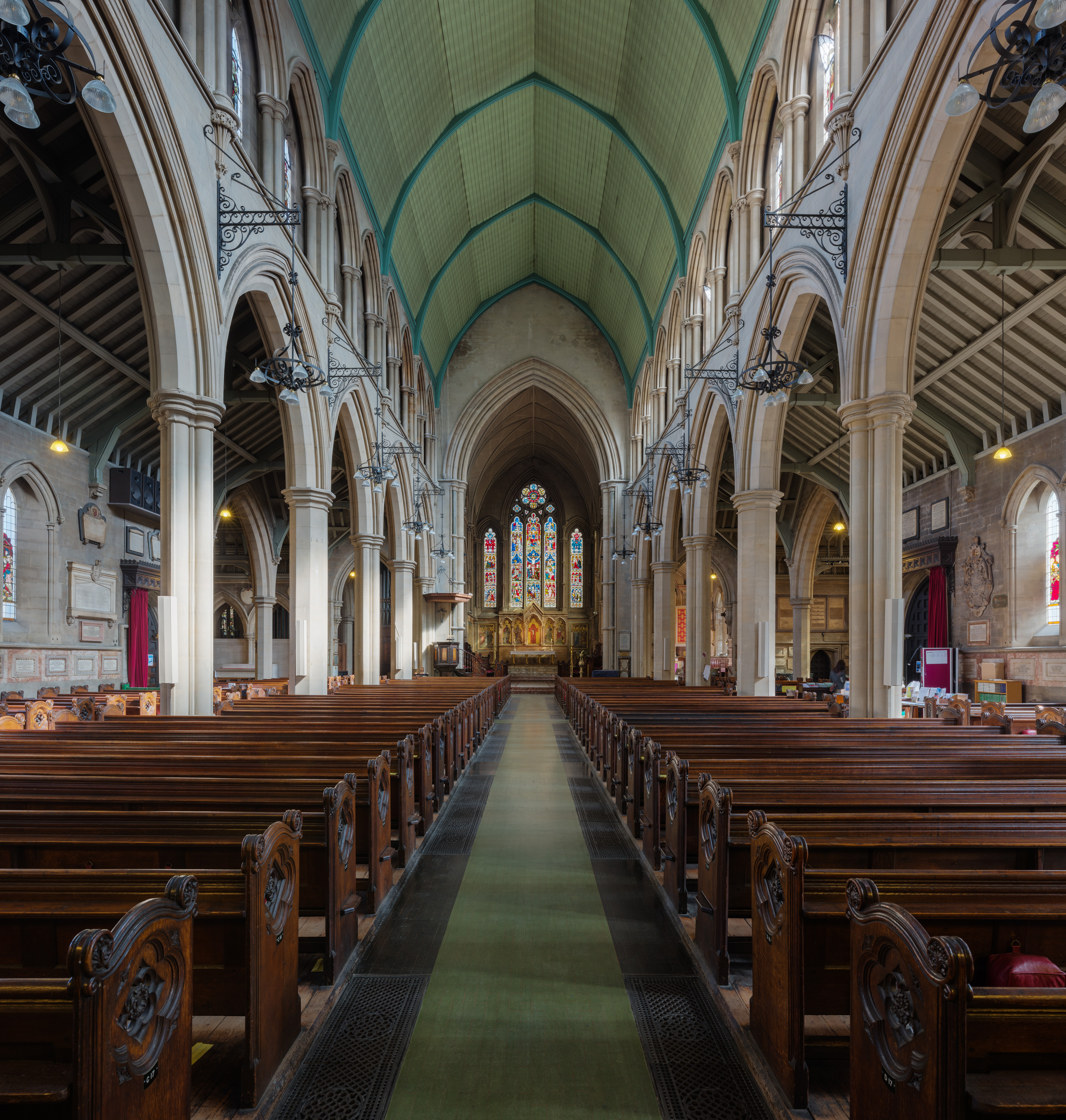
Nave wide-angle view
