= Rainald of Abingdon =

Rainald (also Reginald) (died 1097) was a prominent Abbot of Abingdon.

Rainald was a former monk of Jumièges who was King William I's chaplain when he was appointed Abbot of Abingdon by him in 1084. He died in Normandy.

== Life ==
He was a secular clerk and one of the chaplains of William, Duke of Normandy. He became a monk of Jumièges, and Duke William, then king of England, gave him at Rouen the abbacy of Abingdon on 19 June 1084, his predecessor Æthelhelm, also formerly a monk of Jumièges, having died on 10 September 1083. The king sent him to Walkelin, bishop of Winchester, to be installed in his office. He was received at Abingdon on 18 July, and on 15 August was hallowed by Osmund, bishop of Salisbury.

The tenants of the abbey had resisted the Conqueror's rule, and the house had accordingly suffered; but some return to prosperity seems to have begun under Abbot Æthelhelm, and it increased during the earlier years of Rainald's abbacy. In 1087 Gilbert of Ghent presented the monastery with a house in the Strand, London, with a chapel dedicated to the Holy Innocents, which he had given to it in Æthelhelm's time, but had resumed at his death. It became the abbot's London lodging On the accession of William Rufus, Reginald helped him in the distribution of his father's treasure among the minsters and other churches of England and the poor. At this time the king held him in high esteem, and gave a charter to him and his house.

Though Rainald disposed of some of the convent's property to his son and personal friends, he set about rebuilding the church of the monastery, using materials and treasure collected by his predecessor; and, in order to ensure the co-operation of the villeins on the conventual estates, gathered them together and announced that several oppressive customs would be done away, provided that they gave the full tithes of their harvest for the restoration of the church. Robert d'Oilgi was led by a dream to restore certain land that he had unjustly taken from the house in Abbot Æthelhelm's time, and also gave a large sum towards the building.

After a time, however, enemies of Abbot Rainald set the king against him; and he deprived the convent of much of its property. The king having crossed to Normandy in November 1097, Rainald followed him, probably on the convent's business, and died there before the end of the year.

== Family ==
His son William Rainald had well educated, and took holy orders. He presented him to the convent living of Marcham, near Abingdon, with some of the convent property. When taken with his last sickness in the time of Abbot Faricius, he assumed the monastic habit at Abingdon, and restored to the convent the church and land that he had received from his father.

== Notes ==
Attribution

This article incorporates text from a publication now in the public domain: Lee, Sidney, ed. (1896). "Reginald (d.1097)". Dictionary of National Biography. Vol. 47. London: Smith, Elder & Co.
