= Weston, Berkshire =

Coordinates: 51°27′36″N 1°25′34″W

Weston
- Village
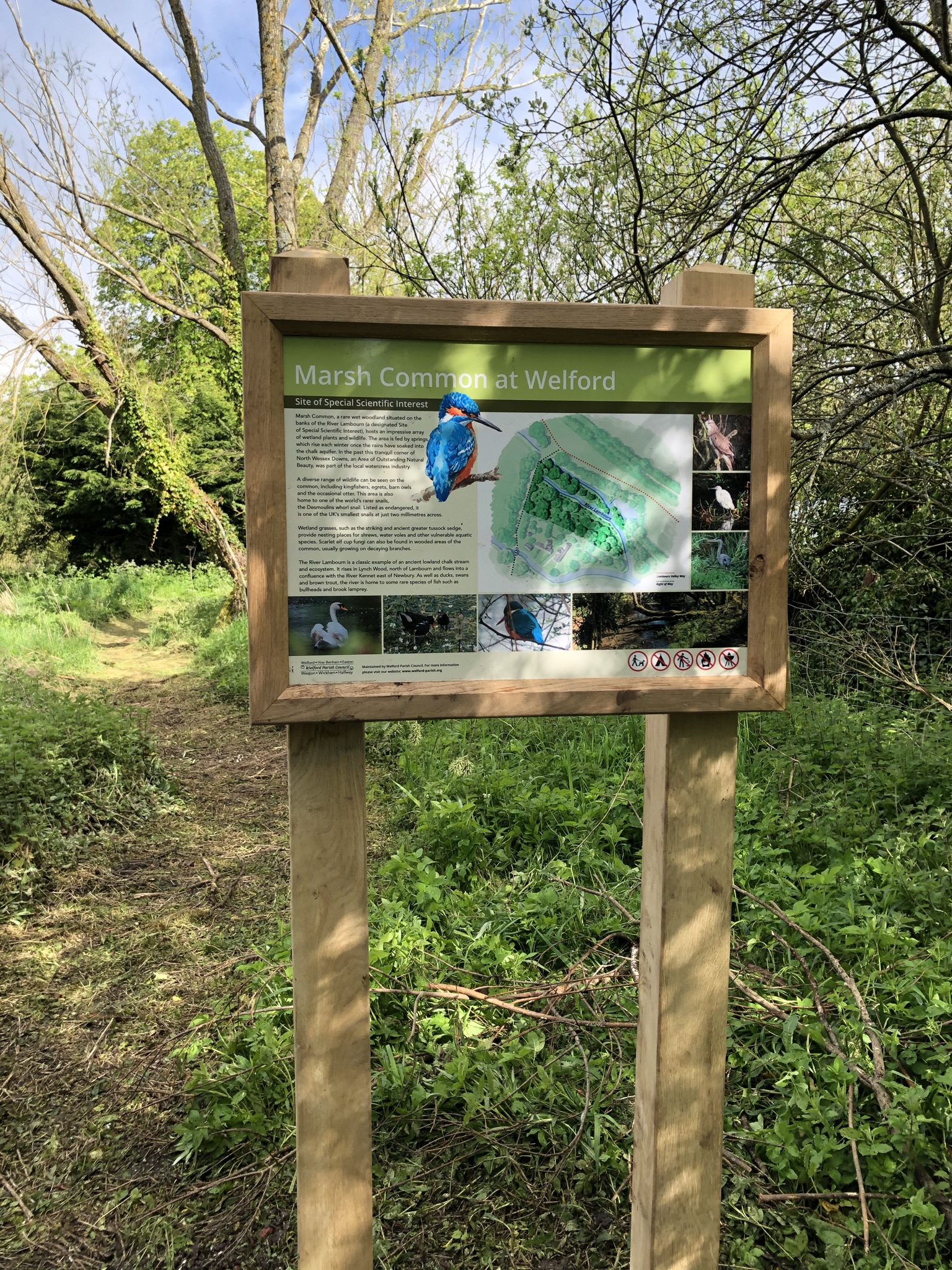
- Marsh Common sign

- Location within Berkshire
- OS grid reference: SU400736
- Civil parish: Welford
- Unitary authority: West Berkshire
- Ceremonial county: Berkshire
- Region: South East
- Country: England
- Sovereign state: United Kingdom
- Post town: Newbury
- Postcode district: RG20
- Dialling code: 01488
- Police: Thames Valley
- Fire: Royal Berkshire
- Ambulance: South Central
- UK Parliament: Newbury

Weston is a village in the civil parish of Welford in the English county of Berkshire.

== History ==
The Domesday Book recorded that Weston was a manor under the control of the "Abingdon Abbey" in 1086.

Of the land in this manor, Reinbold holds Leckhampstead 10 hides and William 4 hides at Weston and Berner 2 hides at Boxford.... There is land for 11 ploughs. There are three ploughs and 12 villans and 24 bordars with six ploughs and six slaves and two acres of meadow and a church. It is and was worth 10 pounds.

== Geography ==
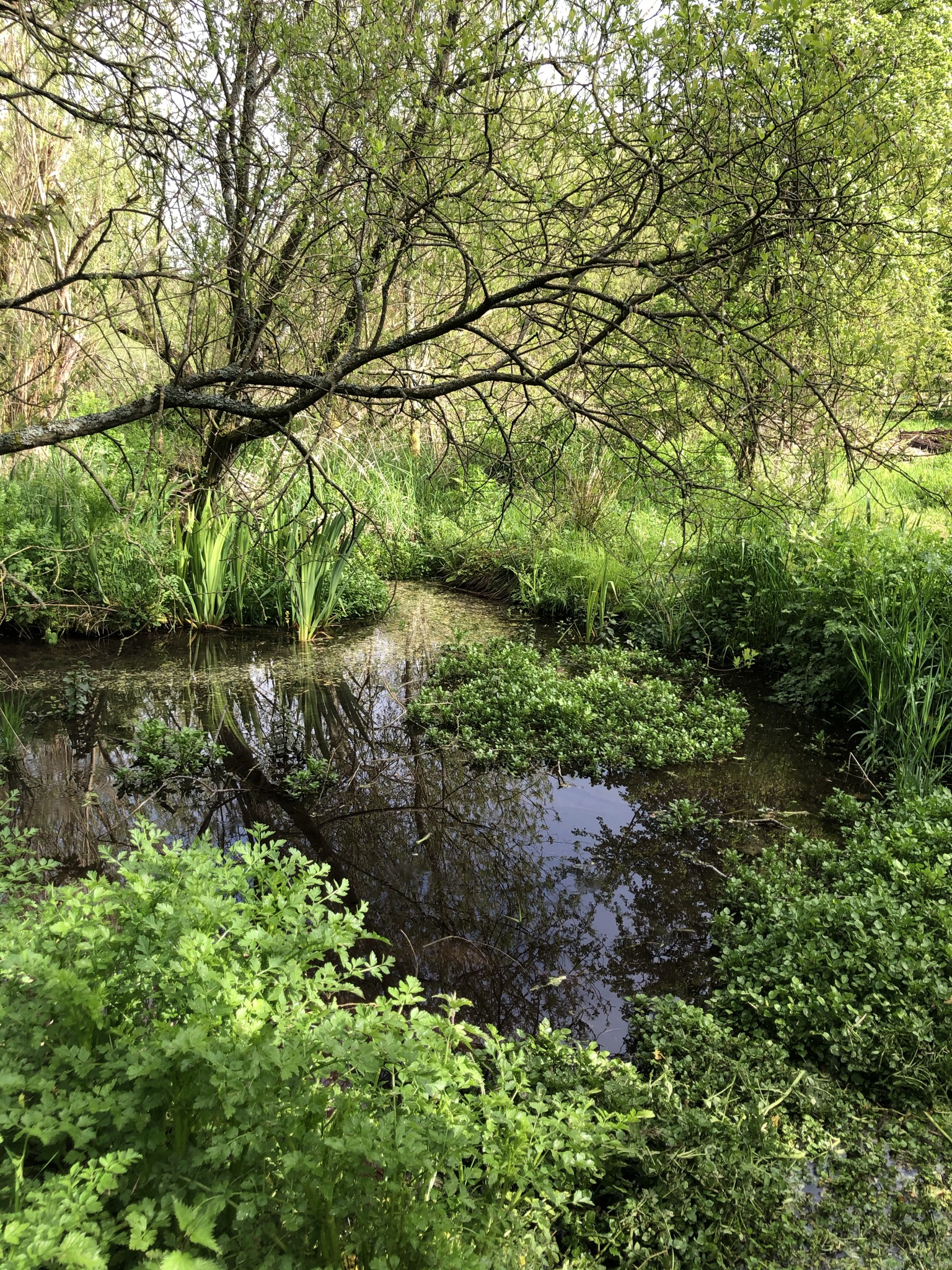
Marsh Common in Weston

It is situated approximately halfway between Great Shefford and Welford on the River Lambourn in the district of West Berkshire. The M4 motorway runs close by. There is a common in Weston, Marsh Common, located between the watermill and the disused railway. The mill is a Grade II listed building.
