= Siward (abbot of Abingdon) =

Siward (died 1048) was Abbot of Abingdon in Berkshire (now Oxfordshire) and a bishop in the Diocese of Canterbury.

Siward was a monk at Glastonbury until he was appointed Abbot of Abingdon in 1030. He was made coadjutor to the Archbishop of Canterbury in 1044. Kelly asserts Siward was titled Bishop of St Martin's, but Somner finds no evidence of this, and claims Siward was consecrated Bishop of Uppsala. However no Bishops of Uppsala are dated to this time and it is probably a confusion with a later Siward who was connected to Uppsala in the period 1123–1142.

The Historia Ecclesie Abbendonensis explains that Siward was chosen by Archbishop Eadsige of Canterbury to carry out the archbishop's duties. This was due to the archbishop's own ill heath, and was done with King Edward's consent. Eadsige elevated Siward to the rank of bishop, but no mention is made of the title of this bishopric.

At Abingdon Siward was replaced by Æthelstan, but he retained an interest in his former position. Between 1044 and 1048 he was involved in a legal dispute between a noble named Brihtwine and the abbey regarding land held at Leckhampstead. In the time of King Cnut this land had passed from the abbey to Brihtwine's father Brihtmund for a term of three generations. The abbey claimed that these generations had passed with Brihtmund, his wife and elder son. Brihtwine, a younger son, argued otherwise. In a writ, Siward supported the abbey's case, but the matter was not resolved until after Siward's death.

Siward resigned from his position at Canterbury in 1048 due to ill health. He returned to Abingdon and died a few months later (the same year). He was buried at Abingdon. As a result of the death some land and personal treasures including the furnishings of his chapel were given to Abingdon Abbey

== Bibliography ==
- Hudson, John (2007). Historia Ecclesie Abbendonensis: The history of the Church of Abingdon. Oxford Medieval Texts. Oxford: Clarendon Press. ISBN 978-0-19-929937-9. OCLC 50099829.
