= Osgar =

Osgar was a 10th-century Abbot of Abingdon in the English county of Berkshire (now Oxfordshire).

Osgar was a cleric in minor orders who went with Saint Aethelwold from Glastonbury to Abingdon. He was eventually appointed Æthelwold's successor, probably in 964 and died in 984 (Kelly 2000).
