= Æthelsige =

English abbot

Æthelsige was an Abbot of Abingdon and succeeded Wulfgar in 1016 (Anglo-Saxon Chronicle, version C).

Æthelsige lived in the town today called Elswick, known then as "'Edelesuuic," literally "the farm of a man named Æthelsige." Before he died in 1018 he was principal in the treaty between Danes and English to observe the laws of Edgar. He was succeeded by his son Æthelwine (Anglo-Saxon Chronicle, version E).
