= Leckhampstead =

Leckhampstead is the name of more than one place. It is an Anglo-Saxon name, meaning 'homestead where leeks are grown'.

In the United Kingdom:

- Leckhampstead, Berkshire
- Leckhampstead, Buckinghamshire
