= Boxford, Berkshire =

Coordinates: 51°26′28″N 1°22′48″W

Boxford
- Village and civil parish
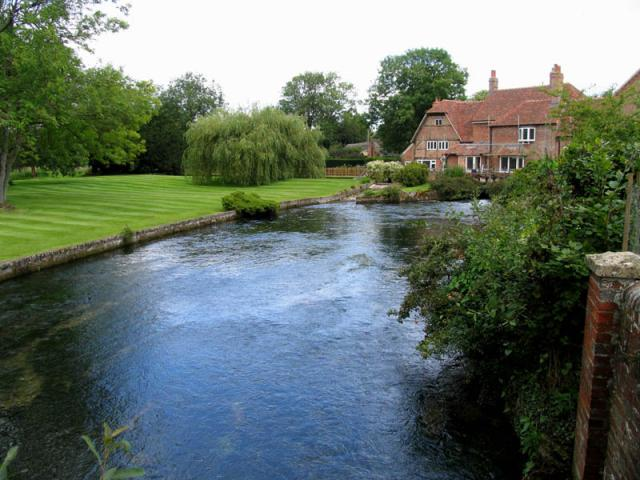
- Watermill at the centre of the village

- Location within Berkshire
- Area: 11.74 km^{2} (4.53 sq mi)
- Population: 463 (2011 census)
  - Density: 39/km^{2} (100/sq mi)
- OS grid reference: SU428715
- Civil parish: Boxford
- Unitary authority: West Berkshire
- Ceremonial county: Berkshire
- Region: South East
- Country: England
- Sovereign state: United Kingdom
- Post town: Newbury
- Postcode district: RG20
- Dialling code: 01488
- Police: Thames Valley
- Fire: Royal Berkshire
- Ambulance: South Central
- UK Parliament: Newbury
- Website: Boxford Royal County of Berkshire

Boxford is a village and civil parish in the unitary authority of West Berkshire, England. The village is on the east bank of the River Lambourn, about 4 miles (6.4 km) northwest of Newbury but south of the M4 motorway. The hamlet of Westbrook is on the opposite bank of the Berkshire Downs tributary.

== Archaeology ==
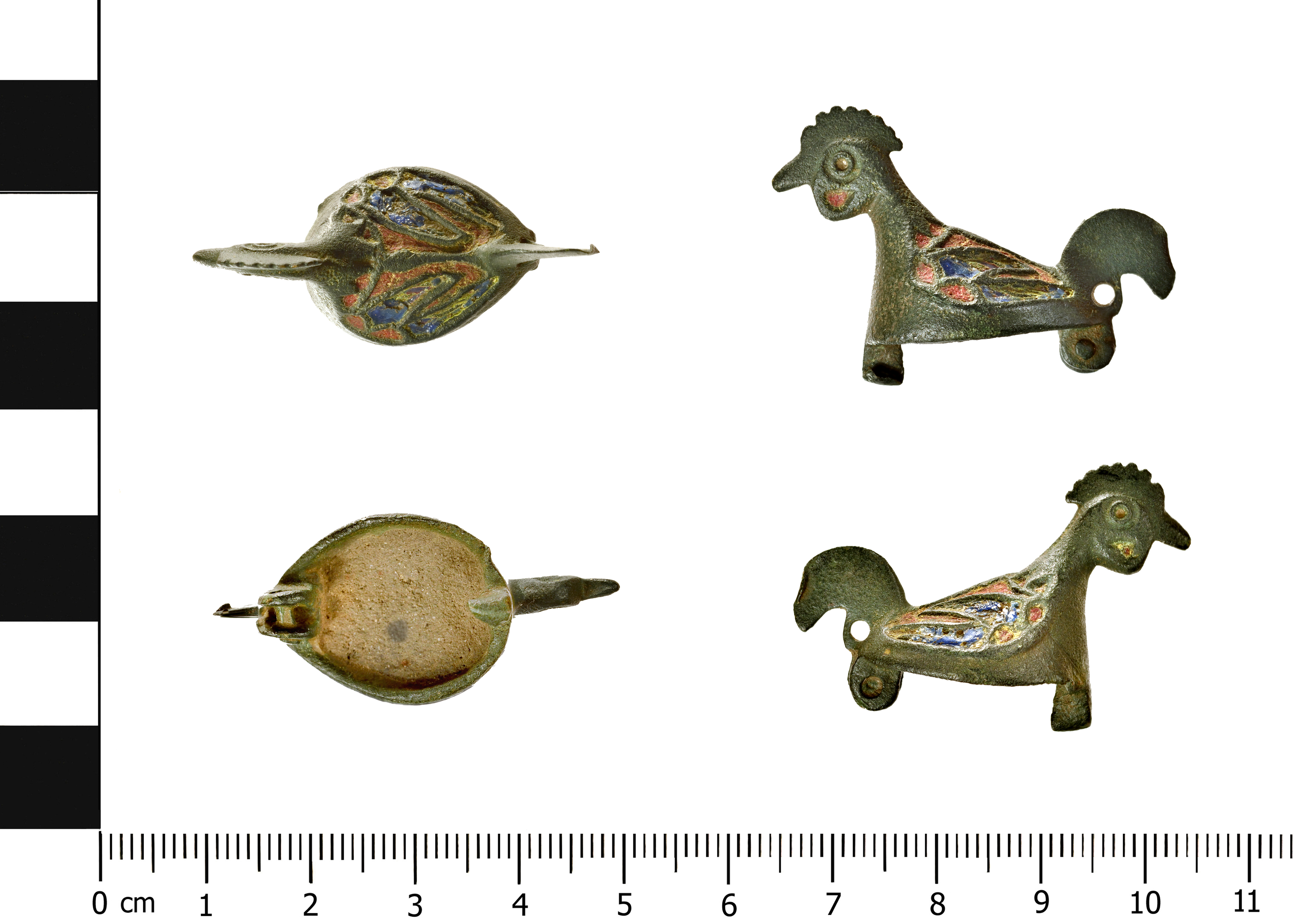
A Roman brooch in the shape of a cockerel, found in Boxford and dated to c. 100 – c. 200

A number of Bronze Age features have been recorded near Boxford, and an urn of this period has been found. A hearth and pottery fragments from the Iron Age, including a La Tène pot, have been found near the north end of Boxford Common. Iron Age pottery fragments and a possible earthwork have also been found near Borough Hill. Mud Hall Cottage on Wyfield Farm is the site of a large Roman building which was excavated about 1870. Roman pottery and coins have been found at Boxford Rectory. The course of the Ermin Way Roman road that linked Corinium Dobunnorum (Cirencester) and Calleva Atrebatum (Silchester) passes through the south of the parish. A 140-yard (130 m) section is visible from aerial archaeology near William's Copse. The Boxford Roman mosaic, perhaps 10 metres (33 feet) square, was found in 2017. It was on the floor of a villa dating from the 4th century AD.

== Manor ==
In 958 King Eadred granted property at Boxore to his servant Wulfric, and in 968 King Edgar the Peaceful granted a similar amount of property here to his servant Elfwin. Both men ceded their holdings to Abingdon Abbey, which thus held the whole manor of Boxford before the Norman Conquest. Domesday Book of 1086 records Boxford as Bochesorne. It says under the list of lands that belonged to Abingdon Abbey:

Of the land in this manor, Reinbold holds Leckhampstead 10 hides and William 4 hides at Weston and Berner 2 hides at Boxford... There is land for 11 ploughs. There are three ploughs and 12 villeins and 24 bordars with six ploughs and six four slaves and two acres of meadow and a church. It is and was worth 10 pounds.

Boxford House is a Grade II listed country house which is believed to date from 1825. It is built of ashlar masonry in a Gothic revival style, with mullioned and transomed windows. It has a slate roof and a parapet.

== Parish church ==
The Church of England parish church of Saint Andrew consists of a chancel, nave, north aisle, north-west vestry, south porch and a west bell tower. The chancel may be Anglo-Saxon, and an Anglo-Saxon window was discovered in a wall of the church in 2011. The Jacobean pulpit dates from 1618, the font from about 1662 and the west tower from about 1692. Much of the church was rebuilt in the Victorian era and in 1841 the north aisle was added. However, the arcade between the nave and north aisle was probably by John Oldrid Scott and Sons in 1908. The building is Grade II* listed.

== Social and economic history ==
The village has a number of thatched cottages and a watermill. Boxford railway station was opened by the Lambourn Valley Railway in 1898 and closed by British Railways in 1960. Boxford is known for the Boxford Masques, an outdoor midsummer celebration, held on Hoar Hill in woodland above the village, overlooking the Lambourn valley. It was originally created in the late 19th century by Charlotte Peake, a local writer and lover of music, drama and poetry. The Boxford Masques were performed by locals and lasted up until the First World War. Annual performances were revived in the year 2000 by the Watermill Theatre of Bagnor, near Newbury, following extensive research by John Vigor.

== Geography ==
Boxford has several sites of Special Scientific Interest (SSSI); Easton Farm Meadow, Boxford Chalk Pit and Boxford Water Meadows.

== Demography ==
2011 Published Statistics: Population, home ownership and extracts from Physical Environment, surveyed in 2005
Output area	Homes owned outright	Owned with a loan	Socially rented	Privately rented	Other	km^{2} roads	km^{2} water	km^{2} domestic gardens	Usual residents	km^{2}
Civil parish	76	65	20	26	5	0.163	0.057	0.234	463	11.74

== Sources ==
- Page, W.H.; Ditchfield, P.H., eds. (1924). A History of the County of Berkshire, Volume 4. Victoria County History. pp. 44–48.
- Pevsner, Nikolaus (1966). Berkshire. The Buildings of England. Harmondsworth: Penguin Books. pp. 92–93.
