= Theobald of Étampes =

French schoolmaster and theologian

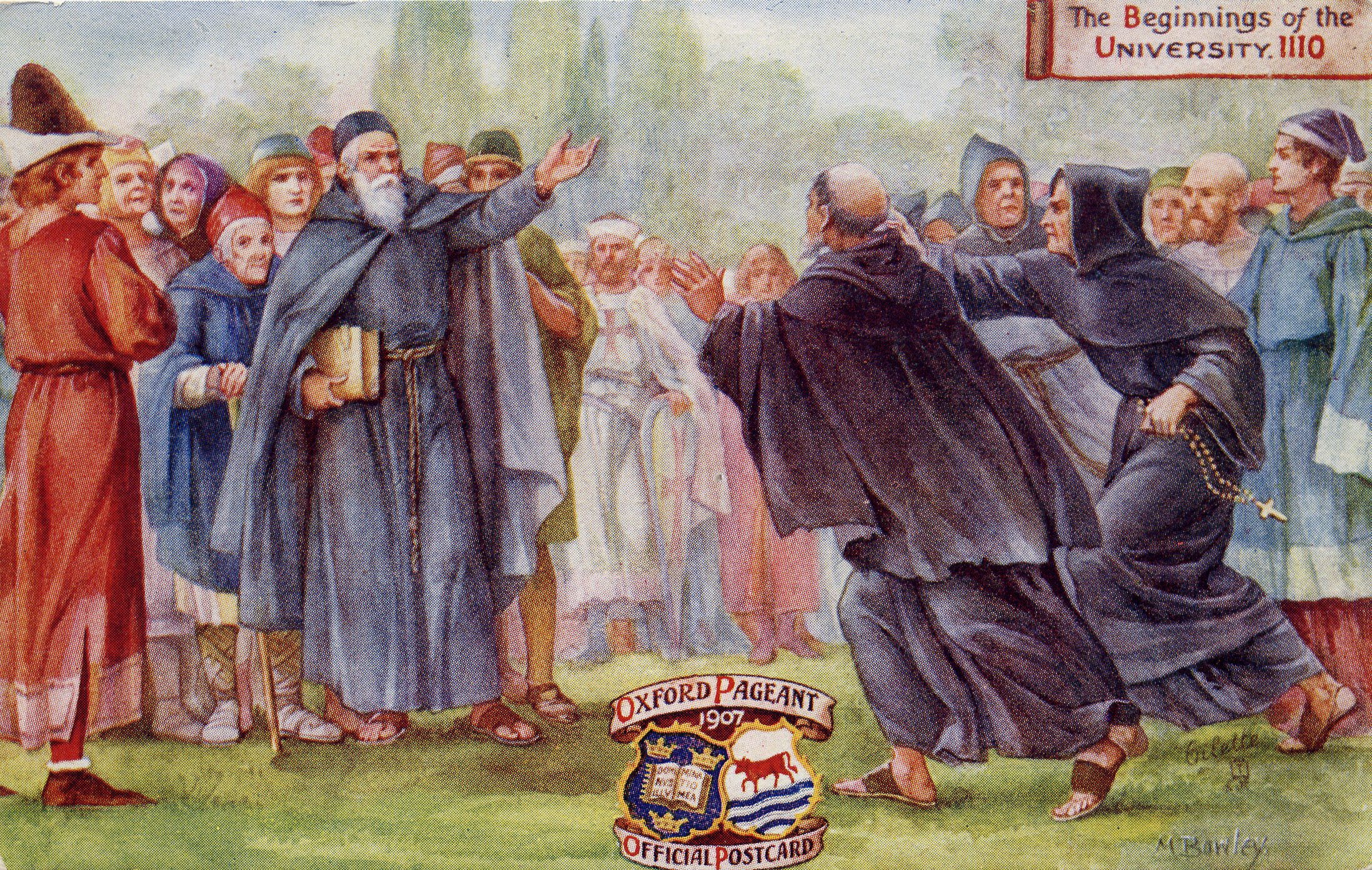
Theobald's arrival at Oxford, opposed by a pair of monks from Abingdon. A postcard by C. Bowley from 1907, treating Theobald's arrival as the beginning of the university. The date in the top right corner, however, is wrong.

Theobald of Étampes (Latin: Theobaldus Stampensis; French: Thibaud/Thibault d'Étampes; born before 1080, died after 1120) was a medieval schoolmaster from the Kingdom of France and theologian hostile to priestly celibacy. He is the first scholar known to have lectured at Oxford and is considered a forerunner of Oxford University.

== Biography ==
Theobald's biography has been reconstructed by Bernard Gineste. Theobald was a canon and the son of a canon from Étampes, in the Kingdom of France. As a child he knew many married priests around Étampes, at a time when the Gregorian reform was seeking to enforce clerical celibacy. He was probably educated in the Chartres Cathedral School, and became master (in Latin scholaster) of the school of the parish of Saint-Martin at Étampes and a private tutor to the young viscount of Chartres, Hugh III of Le Puiset. After King Philip I of France annexed Étampes to the royal domain he began to favour the monks of Morigny over the local priests. In 1113, after Hugh of Le Puiset was captured and imprisoned by royal forces, Theobald left Étampes for the Duchy of Normandy. There he became schoolmaster at Caen and planned to leave France for Denmark, but in the end he crossed the Channel to England, where the Duke of Normandy, Henry Beauclerc, was king. At Oxford he gave public lectures in Latin to audiences of between 60 and 100 clerics.

== Work and thinking ==
Six letters of Theobald of Étampes have been preserved.

Two are written in Caen. The first is a letter written to a certain Philipp, who had committed an undetermined sexual deviation and sustained harassment accordingly; consoling him Theobald develops the idea that the faults of this kind are not the most serious, and that pride is a far more dangerous sin; he very clearly suggests that those who make profession of chastity often fall into pedophilia. The second letter is sent to a Queen Margarita, thought until recently to be Saint Margaret of Scotland, died in 1093, but Gineste has shown she is Margaret Fredkulla, Queen of Denmark, still alive in 1116. He thanked the Queen of liberality of the Abbey of Saint-Étienne of Caen and seems to make service offerings.

Four are written from Oxford. It seems impossible to give them a chronological order. One is addressed to Faritius, Abbot of Abingdon, to defend himself from a charge of heresy. He has defended and shows that his teaching is Orthodox: dead children who have not been baptized go to hell. The second letter is sent to the Bishop of Lincoln, England; it is the longest and is proving by the authority of Scripture and the Fathers of the Church that even the greatest sinners can access the salvation if he repents up to his final hour. The third is addressed to the heretical Roscellinus of Compiègne. However, the doctrine of Roscellinus about Trinity does not interest Theobald. He accuses him of criticizing the sons of priests, and defends them by pointing out that Saint John the Baptist was one. He also expresses an extremely rare opinion on this subject: the Virgin Mary was also a daughter of a priest. The last of these four letters of Oxford deals with the monks and denies them the right to take the place of the clerics, and to collect tithes and benefits which were until then the monopoly of the clerics and the canons.

This last short letter has subjected to an anonymous monk an endless answer, partly written in verses which may support the clerics and the canons of the time, and praise in return for the monks, trimmed of all virtues.

== Place in the history of ideas and traditions ==
- Theobald of Étampes is not a major author, but is one such early intellectual who has paved the way to the great 12th century Renaissance. The major principles of teaching are respect and methodical, in other words reasoned exposure (in Latin rationabiliter) of the Catholic doctrine.
- His thoughts should be seen in the great debate of his time: for or against the great Gregorian reform; for or against the taking of power within the Church, by the monks, at a time where all the Popes are former monks and attempt to impose by force throughout the clergy their ascetic designs.
- Also Oxfordian historiography often saw him as the founder of the university, and in 1907 a skit was composed and performed presenting him as the introducer of the enlightenment in Oxford, in opposition to the forces of darkness represented by the monks of Abingdon.
- He attracted the sympathy of the Anglican Church by his hostility to the celibacy of the priests, celibacy that met resistance in fact in Northern Europe until the end of the Middle Ages, while in Catholic France his work was gradually forgotten.
