= Abingdon Chronicle =

The Abingdon Chronicle may refer to:

- Manuscripts B and C of the Anglo-Saxon Chronicle
- Historia Ecclesie Abbendonensis, a 12th-century Latin chronicle written at Abingdon
