= Leckhampstead War Memorial =

War memorial in Leckhampstead, Berkshire, England

Coordinates: 51°29′06″N 1°22′07″W

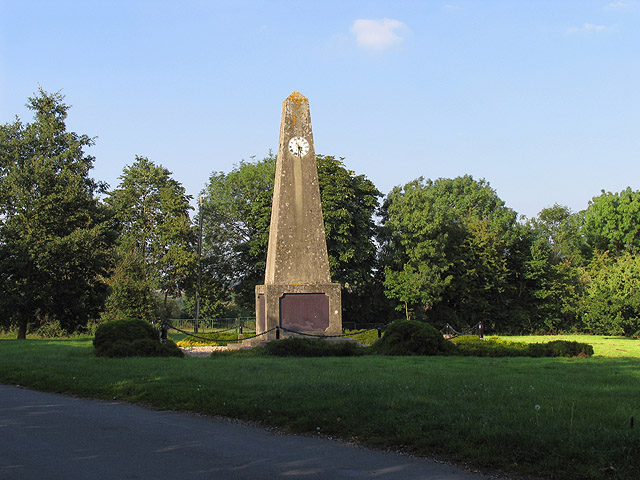
War memorial in 2005

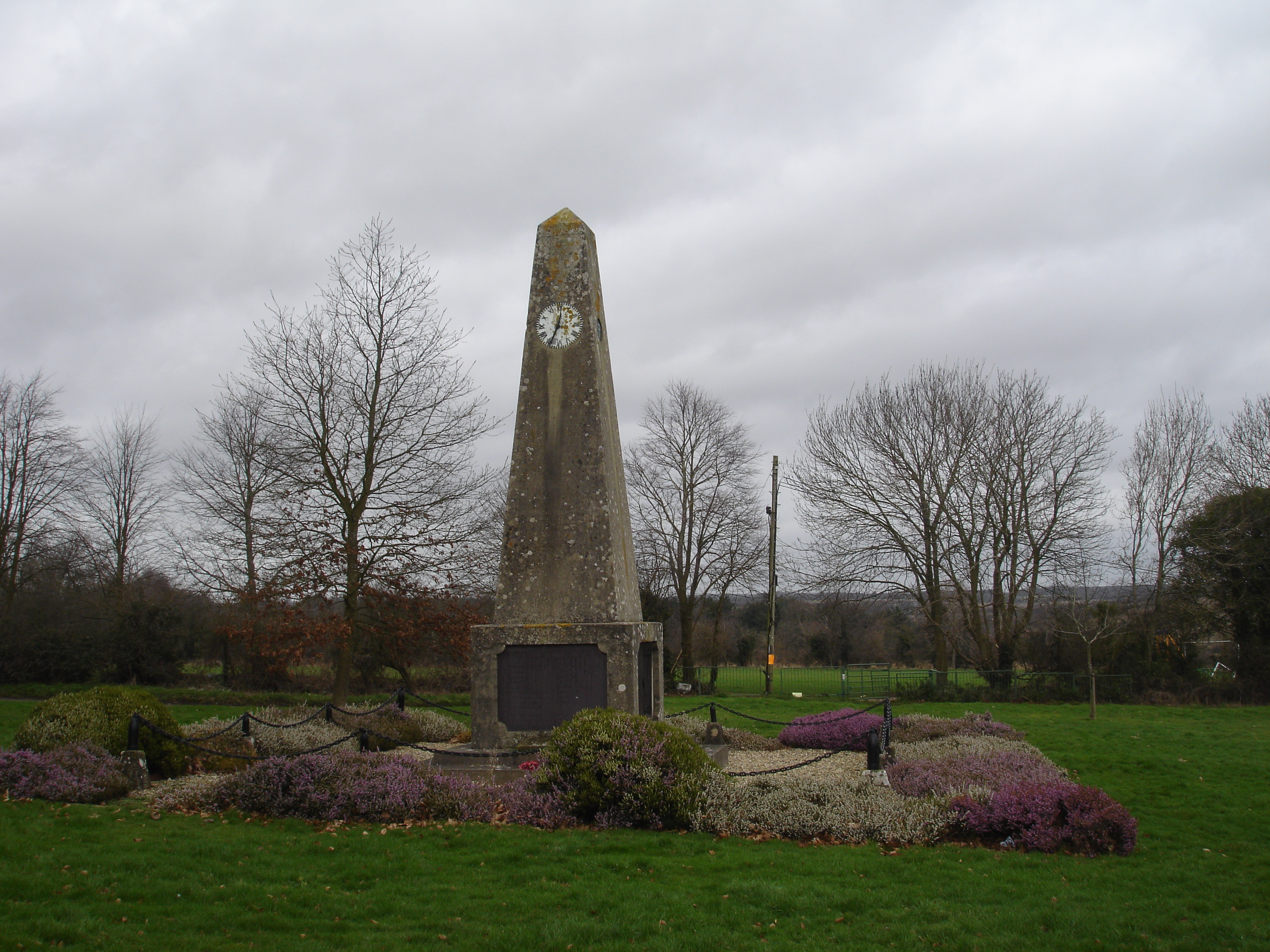
War memorial in 2008

Leckhampstead War Memorial is a Grade II listed war memorial in Leckhampstead, Berkshire, which commemorates 89 local men who served in the First World War, including 17 war dead. The names of two more war casualties were added after the Second World War.

The memorial was funded by a Canadian businessman, Hector Morison, who lived in the village from 1908. It is sited on the triangular village green, near the Grade II listed Leckhampstead House. Unusually, salvaged military items – shell cases, bullets and bayonets – were used as a form of trench art to decorate the memorial.

It comprises a tapering Portland stone obelisk about 7.6 m (25 ft) high, standing on a square plinth on two steps, surrounded by a gravelled area. Clock faces are marked out on the north and south faces of the obelisk, with Roman numerals for the hours made from .303 rifle cartridges, the minutes marked by .303 bullets, and the clock's hands made from bayonets. Set into the other two faces are bronze medallions resembling the obverse (King George V, east) and reverse (Saint George, west) of the British War Medal.

Inscriptions on slate tablets set into the plinth record the names of 17 war dead, and of 72 others who also served in the British armed forces, and the words "PASS NOT THIS STONE IN SORROW, BUT IN PRIDE / AND MAY YOU LIVE AS NOBLY AS THEY DIED". A small tablet on the south side records the names of two men killed in the Second World War.

The memorial is surrounded by chains reputedly taken from a battleship that took part in the Battle of Jutland, supported on 12 four inch shell cases mounted on pyramidal stone posts It was designated as a Grade II listed building in May 2016.
