= Leckhampstead, Berkshire =

Coordinates: 51°29′02″N 1°22′08″W

Leckhampstead
- Village and civil parish
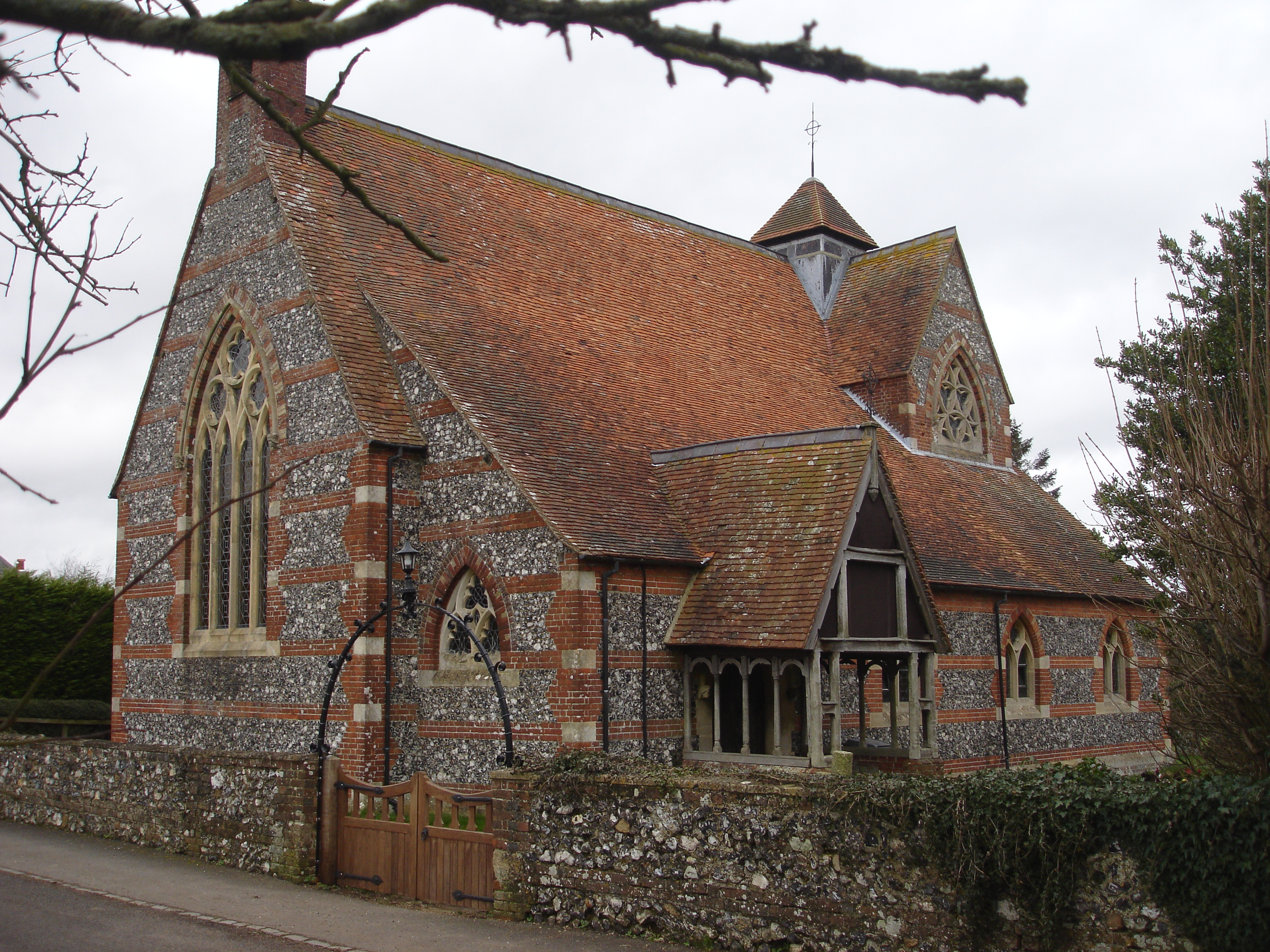
- The ecclesiastical parish church in the Church of England, to St James, built c.1858–60.

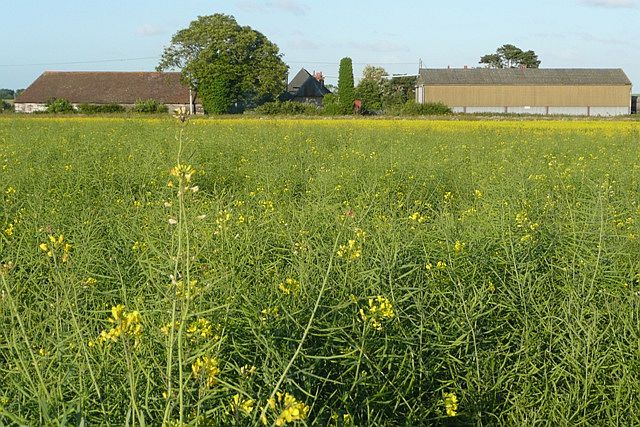
- Manor Farm House, various dates from the 17th century, outbuildings and cultivated fields.

- Location within Berkshire
- Area: 7.13 km^{2} (2.75 sq mi)
- Population: 343 (2011 census)
  - Density: 48/km^{2} (120/sq mi)
- Civil parish: Leckhampstead
- Unitary authority: West Berkshire
- Ceremonial county: Berkshire
- Region: South East
- Country: England
- Sovereign state: United Kingdom
- Post town: Newbury
- Postcode district: RG20
- Dialling code: 01635
- Police: Thames Valley
- Fire: Royal Berkshire
- Ambulance: South Central
- UK Parliament: Newbury

Leckhampstead is a village and civil parish in West Berkshire, England in the North Wessex Downs. A road and boundary stone in Leckhampstead, the Hangman's Stone and Hangman's Stone Lane, are named after a tale of a man who roped and carried a stolen sheep from a farm in Leckhampstead around his neck, but which strangled him after he stopped and slept. After a long hiatus the area returned to full village status in 1864. Its hamlet of Hill Green has six listed buildings and the amenities of the village include a public house, church and village hall. The associated hamlet of Leckhampstead Thicket has a high proportion of its buildings that are thatched cottages and has a Primitive Methodist chapel, dated 1874.

== Geography ==
The village is in the North Wessex Downs, a few miles north of the M4 motorway. The main residential area is a linear development, the B4494 road, between Newbury (7 miles (11 km)) and Wantage (8 miles (13 km)), passes within 1,300 ft (400 m) of its eastern edge. Most of the land is agricultural with a few woodlands, particularly along the northern border where elevation exceeds 560 ft (170 m) above sea level. There are several winterbournes in this area. The land being on the chalk downs, most of the natural drainage is subterranean, which is borne out by the land survey by the Office for National Statistics having been unable to identify any water at the surface.

== History ==
Sarsen stones and Bronze Age features, are in the bounds of Leckhampstead at Hill Green and a flint arrowhead of this period has been found. A small round barrow is in the south-east. Roman finds include a 2nd-century earring and Samian ware. A church, dedicated in 1050, for most of its existence, a chapel under the vicar of Chieveley has been recorded about 0.6 miles (1 km) east of the present church, on the site of Chapel Farm. Therefore, until 1835, when it gained a civil parish council this area was administratively part of the parish of Chieveley. Ecclesiastical affairs having been divorced from the state at the local level about this time, in 1884, Leckhampstead ecclesiastical parish was recreated, twenty years after a new church for Leckhampstead was dedicated to replace its ruined chapel. The Domesday Book of 1086 records that Lecanestede was held by Abingdon Abbey.

"Of the land in this manor, Reinbold holds Leckhampstead 10 hides and William 4 hides at Weston and Berner 2 hides at Boxford.... There is land for 11 ploughs. There are three plough [team]s of 12 villans and 24 bordars (smallholders) with six plough[team]s and six slaves and two acres of meadow and a church. It is and was [on Conquest] worth 10 pounds.

The date that Leckhampstead became a property of Abingdon Abbey is uncertain. It is mentioned in a charter, dated to 811 CE, in which King Coenwulf of Mercia handed ten hides of land in Leckhampstead to Abingdon. This charter has however been shown to be a forgery. In 943 CE, a secular noble, named Eadric, was granted Leckhampstead by King Edmund I. It was in the hands of Abingdon Abbey by about 1030, when King Cnut gave it to another secular noble named Brihtmund for three lifetimes, after which it would return to the abbey. In the early 1040s a legal case developed between the abbey and Brihtmund's younger son Brihtwine. The matter was only resolved in the abbey's favour after 1052.

A medieval deer park existed about 1228. The manor passed into secular hands around this time. The manor passed, with that at Donnington, to the Earl of Nottingham, and from him to John Mordaunt and Elizabeth his wife, who sold the site in 1632 to the apparent trustees for the earlier long tenants, the Spicer family. In 1743, a number of members of that family conveyed the estate to John Line. In 1798 it was the property of William Hopson Goodenough. However this was subdivided greatly by the 20th century. The 17th century manor farm house had been much altered but has 17th and 18th century parts and is a listed building.

=== Charities ===
Before the establishment of a uniform national welfare system, two charities were identified of specific Leckhampstead origin or benefit: In 1805 Catherine Mather by will left a sum for the vestry's investment as a distribution. Its total fund stood at £425 5s equivalent to £30,636 in 2023) in 1923 and it producing £10 12s. 4d. per year, payable to the local education authority. In 1872 Hugh Barton Gledstanes left £1,000, on ambiguous trust as the income was directed "for the relief of the poor brethren and for the help of the Lord's servants who carried on the work of the Gospel at Leckhampstead and neighbourhood". The estate was administered in court and its order of 1 June 1883, a few pence under £694, was transferred to the official trustees, producing yearly £17 7s for poor Plymouth Brethren in 1923."

== Landmarks and amenities ==
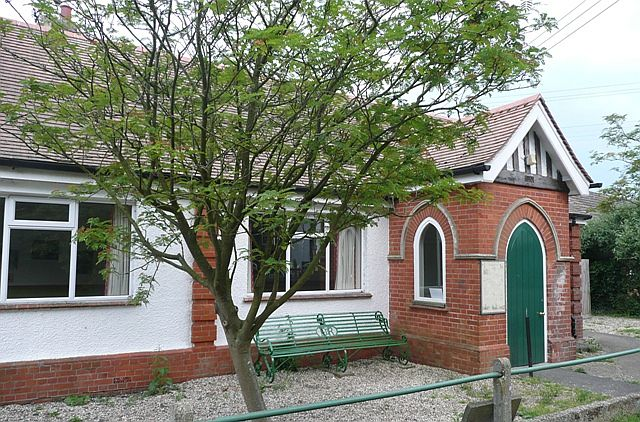
Leckhampstead village hall

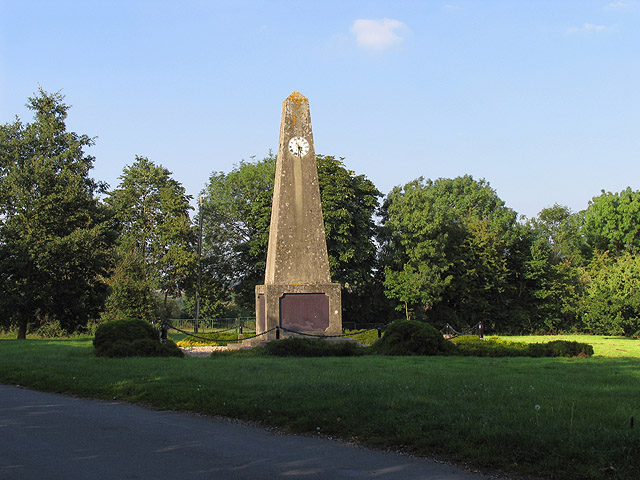
War Memorial, Leckhampstead

The Church of England parish church of St James, built in 1859 of brick and flint, is towards the southern end of the village. It was designed by architect, Samuel Sanders Teulon. The interior is brick with patterns formed by the use of differently coloured brick courses and complementary colour stone embellishments. Leckhampstead has a village hall used for voluntary and social gatherings. The one public house in the village, The Stag, closed in 2017. Leckhampstead War Memorial is sited on the triangular village green. It comprises an obelisk on a plinth with two clock faces, one facing north and one facing south, which incorporate various types of ammunition in them. The surrounding chains are from a battleship that took part in the Battle of Jutland and they are supported on spent shell cases. It was given Grade II listed status in May 2016, legally protecting it from unauthorised modification or removal.

The Hangman's Stone is a boundary stone about a mile south of the middle of the village. It gets its name from a local tale which tells of a sheep rustler who was carrying a stolen sheep over his shoulder with a rope held around his neck. Feeling tired the thief sat on a stone beside the road and fell asleep. The sheep, in struggling to get free, hanged the man by the rope that had remained around his neck. The stone has given its name to the road which passes it, Hangman's Stone Lane, which leads to the village of Boxford. The hamlet of Hill Green has six listed buildings, all in the initial category of Grade II. All are homes, the earliest dating to the early 16th century.

== Leckhampstead Thicket ==
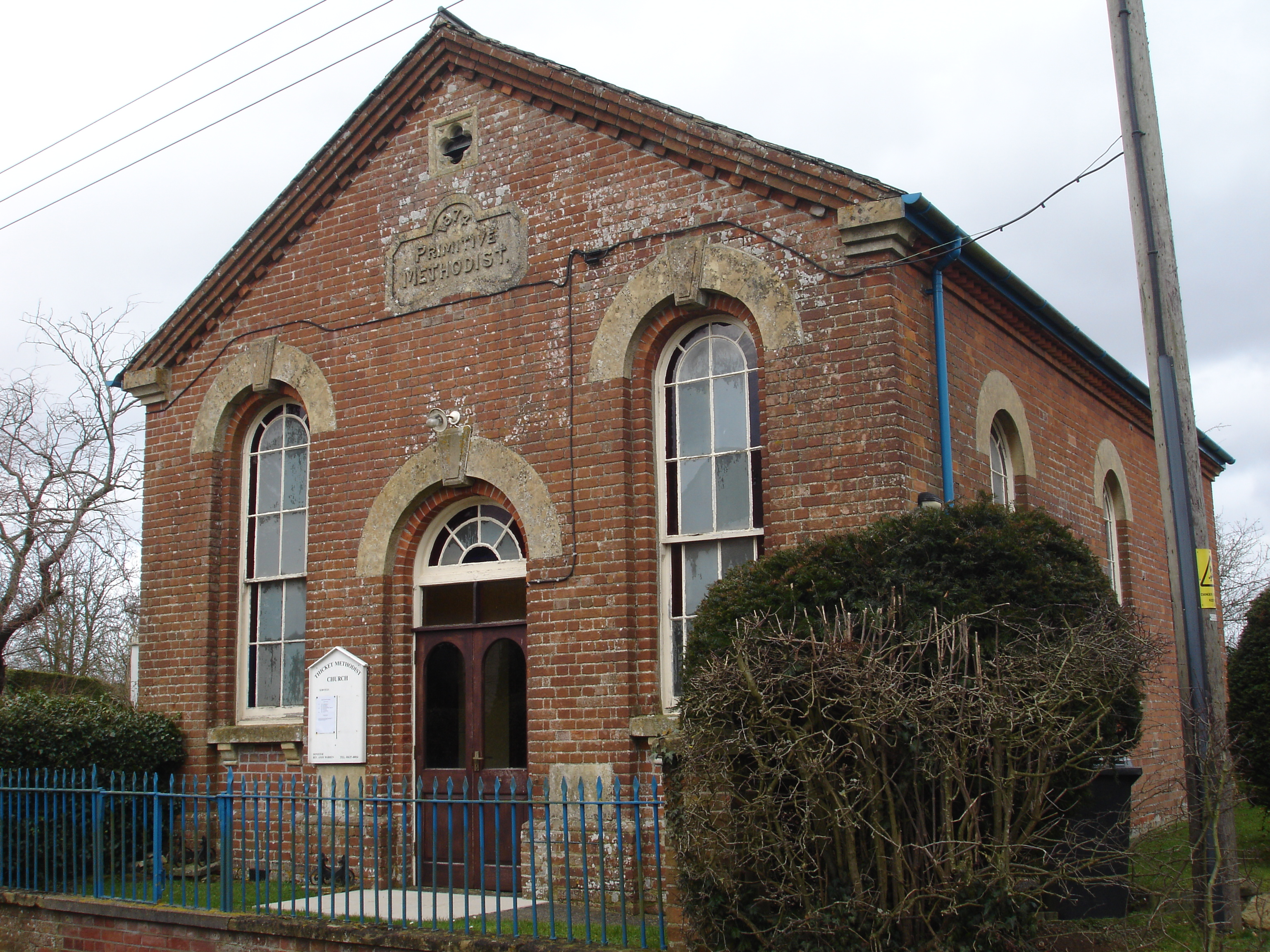
Primitive Methodist chapel at Leckhampstead Thicket

Leckhampstead Thicket is a hamlet between Leckhampstead and Chaddleworth. There are a number of thatched or slate-roofed cottages of which two are listed buildings and a Primitive Methodist chapel, dated 1874, rebuilt from one of 1830, which has not been in use as a chapel for a number of years.

== Transport ==
Bus service 107 connects the village with Newbury. The M4 motorway has a junction within 5 miles (8.0 km) of the parish & two almost straight roads lead towards the south & north in this parish.

== Economy ==
The physical economy within the parish is mainly related to agriculture. In the early 20th century, the brick works at Oare, part of Chieveley, employed some of the villagers. A high proportion of the 16–74 age range in the 2011 census were self-employed.

== Demography ==
2011 Published Statistics: Population, home ownership and extracts from Physical Environment, surveyed in 2005
Output area	Homes owned outright	Owned with a loan	Socially rented	Privately rented	Other	km^{2} roads	km^{2} water	km^{2} domestic gardens	Usual residents	km^{2}
Civil parish	64	42	24	8	3	0.060	0,000	0,160	343	7.13

At the same census 238 people in Leckhampstead were aged 16–74 whose economic activity was divided as follows, per their responses:

2011 Published Statistics: Economic Activity
Output area	Employed	Part-time employed	Self-employed	Retired	Looking After Home or Family	Student	Sick or disabled	Unemployed (active/inactive)
Civil parish	40.8%	10.9%	16.8%	10.9%	7.6%	2.1%	2.5%	5.4%
Nationally	38.6%	13.7%	9.8%	13.7%	4.4%	3.4%	4.0%	6.6%

== Bibliography ==
- Historia Ecclesie Abbendonensis. Vol. 1. Translated by John Hudson. Oxford: Oxford Medieval Texts. 2007.
