= Boxford Roman mosaic =

Roman mosaic in Berkshire, England

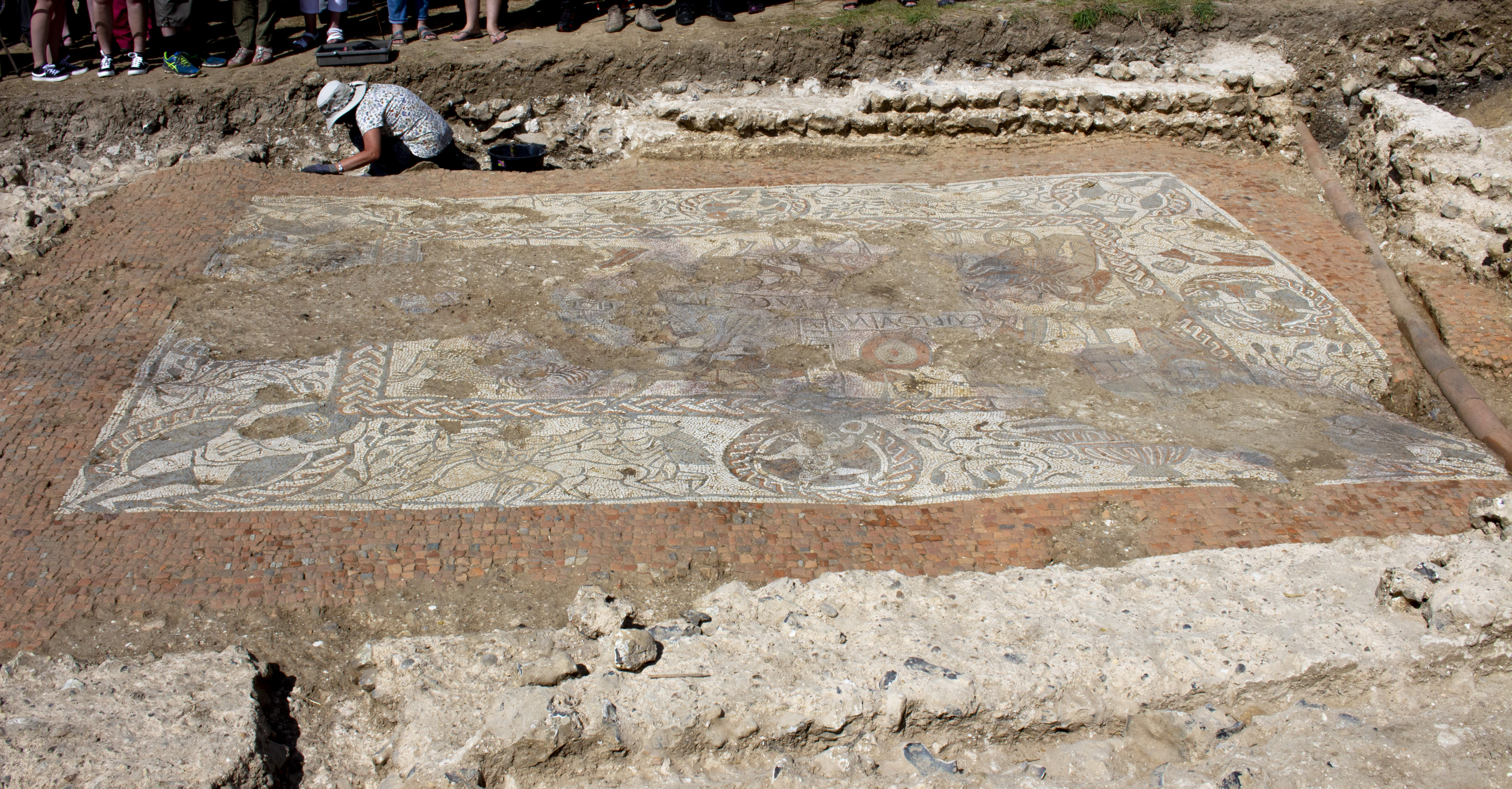
- The mosaic revealed after the August 2019 excavation
- Year: 4th century AD
- Medium: Mosaic
- Dimensions: 6 m (20 ft)
- Location: Boxford, West Berkshire, England

Boxford Roman mosaic is a mosaic at Boxford, West Berkshire, England, discovered during an archaeological dig in August 2017. It dates from the Roman period. The 4th century (AD) mosaic is over 6 metres (20 ft) long. Its central panel is thought to show Bellerophon, at the court of either Iobates or Proteus, battling Chimera.

Anthony Beeson, an expert on Roman mosaics, said it is "without question the most exciting mosaic discovery made in Britain in the last 50 years and must take a premier place amongst those Romano-British works of art that have come down to modern Britons."

== Discovery ==
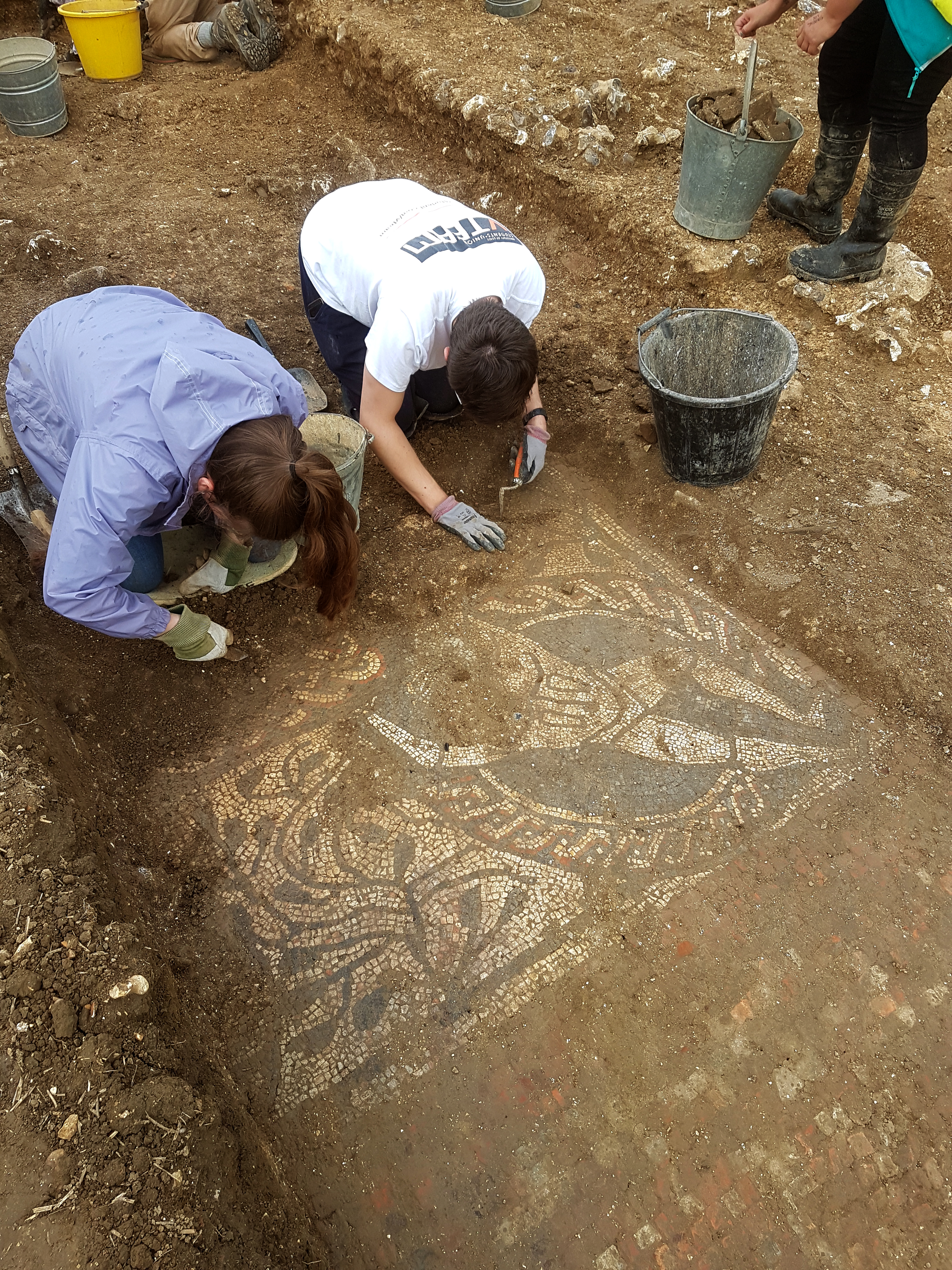
The mosaic during excavation in 2017

The mosaic was revealed during a community archaeology project in 2017. From 2011, the project investigated three Roman sites near the village of Boxford, which was led by the Boxford History Project with the Berkshire Archaeology Research Group, and with the help of many local enthusiastic volunteers and the expertise of Senior Project Officer, Matt Nichol, who from 2013 was seconded to manage fieldwork, record the findings, and help train the volunteers on behalf of Cotswold Archaeology. In 2017, a villa "of modest size" was unearthed at Boxford. The mosaic was found at the eastern end of the building. Only one half of the mosaic was uncovered. It was subsequently reburied, to ensure its preservation. In 2019, the mosaic was fully uncovered, meticulously recorded, and carefully backfilled upon completion.

== Subject of the mosaic ==
Some of the most famous heroes from Greek mythology are brought to life in the stunning artwork. Hercules slays the half-man, half-horse Centaur. Pelops wins the hand of a king's daughter by sabotaging his racing chariot. The handsome Bellerophon kills the fire-breathing Chimaera monster with the help of his flying horse, Pegasus and a lance tipped with lead. This legend spread down the centuries into the folklore of many countries; in Britain, it became Saint George and the Dragon.
