= Adelelm of Jumièges =

Abbot of Abingdon

Adelelm (-1083) was a Norman monk at Jumièges appointed Abbot of Abingdon in 1071; he was part of an embassy from King William II of England to King Malcolm III of Scotland. He died in 1083. (Kelly 2000)
