= Æthelwine of Abingdon =

11th-century abbot

Ethelwine (or Æthelwine) was Abbot of Abingdon.

Æthelsige died in 1018 and was succeeded by Æthelwine (Anglo-Saxon Chronicle, version E), who is said to have died in 1030 (Kelly 2000). Æthelwine enjoyed a close relationship with King Cnut. His skills as a goldsmith were illustrated by his production of a reliquary for Cnut and for the abbey.
