= Easton Farm Meadow =

Protected area in Berkshire, England

- Site of Special Scientific Interest
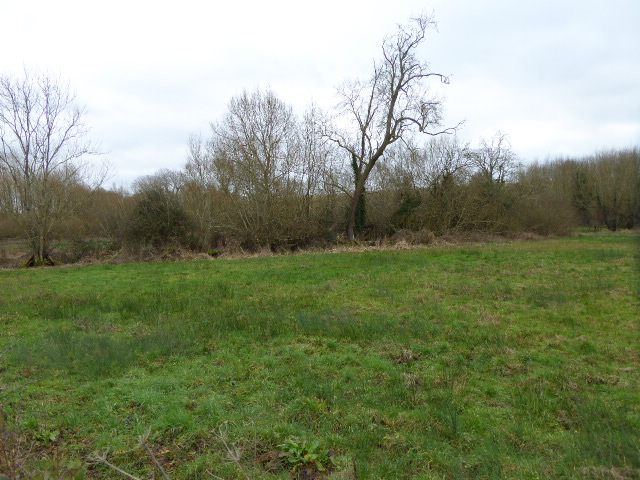

- Location within Berkshire
- Location of Easton Farm Meadow.
- Area of search: Berkshire
- Grid reference: SU 418 721
- Coordinates: 51.446°N 1.400°W
- Interest: Biological
- Area: 1.6 hectares (4.0 acres)
- Notification date: 1985
- Location map: Magic Map

Easton Farm Meadow is a 1.6-hectare (4.0-acre) biological Site of Special Scientific Interest in Easton, west of Boxford in Berkshire. It is in the North Wessex Downs.

The site is lowland neutral grassland In the past the meadows around Easton Farm were managed traditionally as 'floated' water meadows.

== Fauna ==
The site has the following animals

=== Birds ===
- Snipe

=== Invertebrates ===
- Silis ruficollis
- Zicrona caerulea
- Subcoccinella vigintiquatuorpunctata
- Nemotelus pantherinus

== Flora ==
The site has the following Flora:

- Caltha palustris
- Eleocharis palustris
- Filipendula ulmaria
- Angelica sylvestris
- Cirsium palustre
- Galium uliginosum
- Lychnis flos-cuculi
- Holcus lanatus
- Valeriana dioica
- Carex panicea
- Carex nigra
- Iris pseudacorus
- Rumex hydrolapathum
- Carex acutiformis
- Carex paniculata
- Dactylorhiza praetermissa
- Dactylorhiza incarnata
- Blysmus compressus
