= Boxford Water Meadows =

Nature reserve in Berkshire, England

- Site of Special Scientific Interest
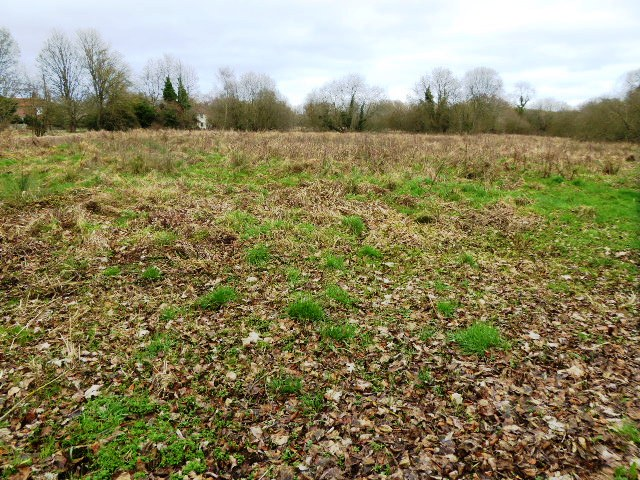

- Location within Berkshire
- Location of Boxford Water Meadows.
- Area of search: Berkshire
- Grid reference: SU 428 718
- Coordinates: 51.444°N 1.386°W
- Interest: Biological
- Area: 13.9 hectares (34 acres)
- Notification date: 1986
- Location map: Magic Map

Boxford Water Meadows is a 13.9-hectare (34-acre) biological Site of Special Scientific Interest in Boxford in Berkshire. It is part of the Kennet & Lambourn Floodplain Special Area of Conservation.

The site comprises disused water meadows and flood pastures in the valley of the River Lambourn. Recorded flora include seventeen species of grass, seven of sedge and seventy-six of grassland herb, some of which are characteristic of ancient meadows which have not been improved or disturbed, such as devil's-bit scabious, water avens and Blysmus compressus, which is an uncommon flat-sedge. There is also a diverse insect fauna.

The site is private land with no public access.
