= Boxford Chalk Pit =

Chalk quarry in Berkshire, England

- Site of Special Scientific Interest
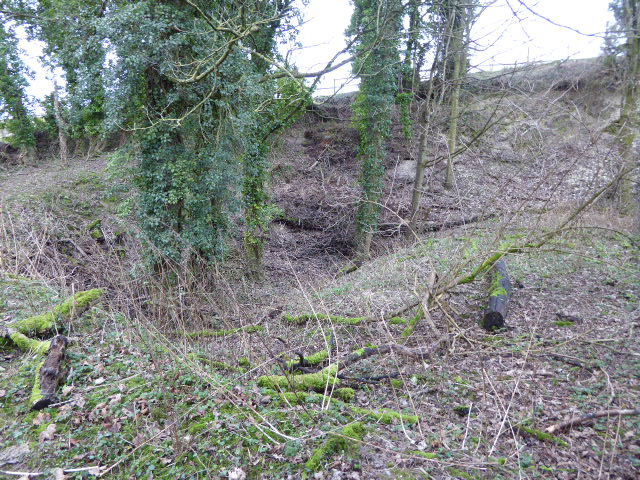

- Location within Berkshire
- Location of Boxford Chalk Pit.
- Area of search: Berkshire
- Grid reference: SU 430 719
- Coordinates: 51.444°N 1.383°W
- Interest: Geological
- Area: 0.4 hectares (0.99 acres)
- Notification date: 1993
- Location map: Magic Map

Boxford Chalk Pit is a 0.4-hectare (0.99-acre) geological Site of Special Scientific Interest in Boxford in Berkshire. It is a Geological Conservation Review site.

This site has a unique succession of tilted beds dating to the Upper Cretaceous, between the late Coniacian and the Santonian, from around 87 to 84 million years ago. The beds are overlain by chalk which contains fractured and folded pieces of hardground, which are interpreted as evidence of localised tectonism unknown in the rest of Britain in this period. There are also coprolites and many tiny fish teeth.
