= Wulfgar of Abingdon =

Abbot of Abingdon

Wulfgar, Abbot of Abingdon was appointed Abbot of Abingdon in 990 AD and died in 1016. (Kelly 2000) An advisor of Æthelred the Unready, he is praised in the Chronicle of Abingdon as a good leader who won restitution of Abingdon lands alienated by the king. In the last year of his life he negotiated with a marauding Danish army, convincing them to spare the Abingdon locale from their depredations (a ransom was paid). Several charters written by him are preserved, and it appears as well that he is responsible for several lines of a Latin elegy, jointly composed with a Frenchman named Herbert, who is otherwise unknown.
