= Ordric =

Ordric was a monk at Abingdon who was elected Abbot of Abingdon in 1052 AD and died in 1066.
