= Abbot of Abingdon =

List of medieval abbots of Abingdon Abbey in England

The Abbot of Abingdon was the head (or abbot) of Anglo-Saxon and eventually Benedictine house of Abingdon Abbey at Abingdon-on-Thames in northern Berkshire (present-day Oxfordshire), England.

The following is a list of abbots of Abingdon:

== Fictional abbots ==
Historian Susan E. Kelly regards the traditional first six abbots as fictional: "There is good reason to think that in most cases their names were simply plucked from early charters available in the abbey's archive, the majority of which would seem to have had no connection with an early minister at Abingdon; there is no very convincing evidence that the historians had access to independent, reliable sources of information. The 'history' of the pre-Æthelwoldian minister seems to a very large extent to represent a fictional reconstruction".

Probably fictional abbots:

Name	Comments
Hæha, also Hean	The legendary first abbot of Abingdon, but, according to Kelly, more probably an abbot of Bradfield, his name having been plucked from a charter dated 704, with others, in order to replace the lost early history of Abingdon Abbey.
Cumma	Cumma is mentioned in a forged charter of King Æthelbald, but "no Abbot Cumma is known from other sources". It is, however, generally considered that the village of Cumnor is named after him.
Hræthhun	A Hræthhun was styled abbot of Abingdon in a charter dated 811, but the charter was forged, probably using the name of Hræthhun (d. 839/40), bishop of Leicester. Kelly therefore excludes him from the list of Abingdon abbots.
Alhhard	Kelly suggests that the name was plucked from the witness list of a charter, with others, in order to reconstruct the lost early history of the Abbey of Abingdon.
Cynath	A Cynath, abbot of Evesham, mistakenly listed by the compiler of the De Abbatibus Abbendoniae as an abbot of Abingdon.
Godescealc	Godescealc's name occurs in three charters, all of them forgeries, and was later extracted from these documents and used in the construction of a spurious early history of the Abbey of Abingdon.

== Abbots ==
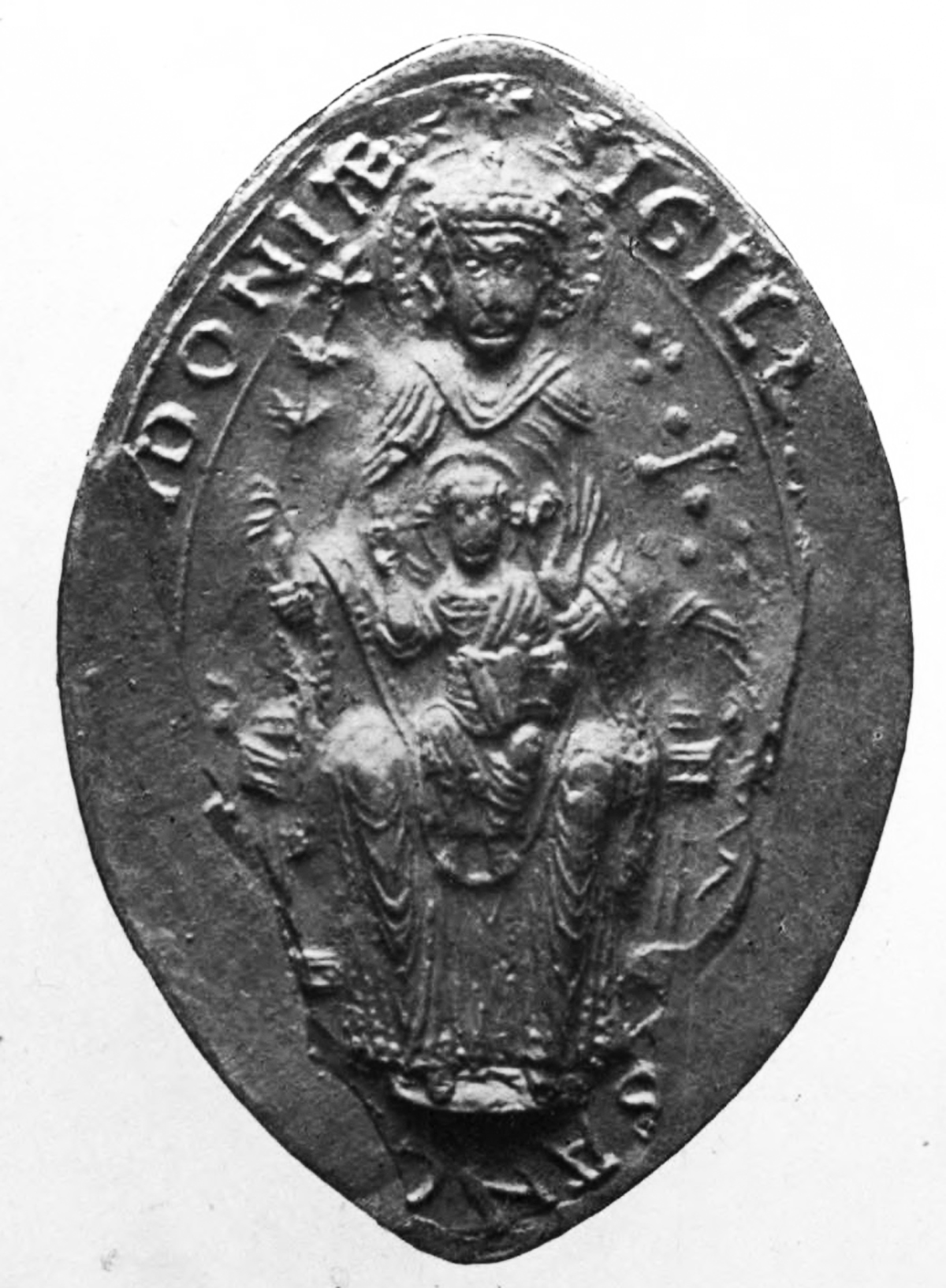
Abbey seal

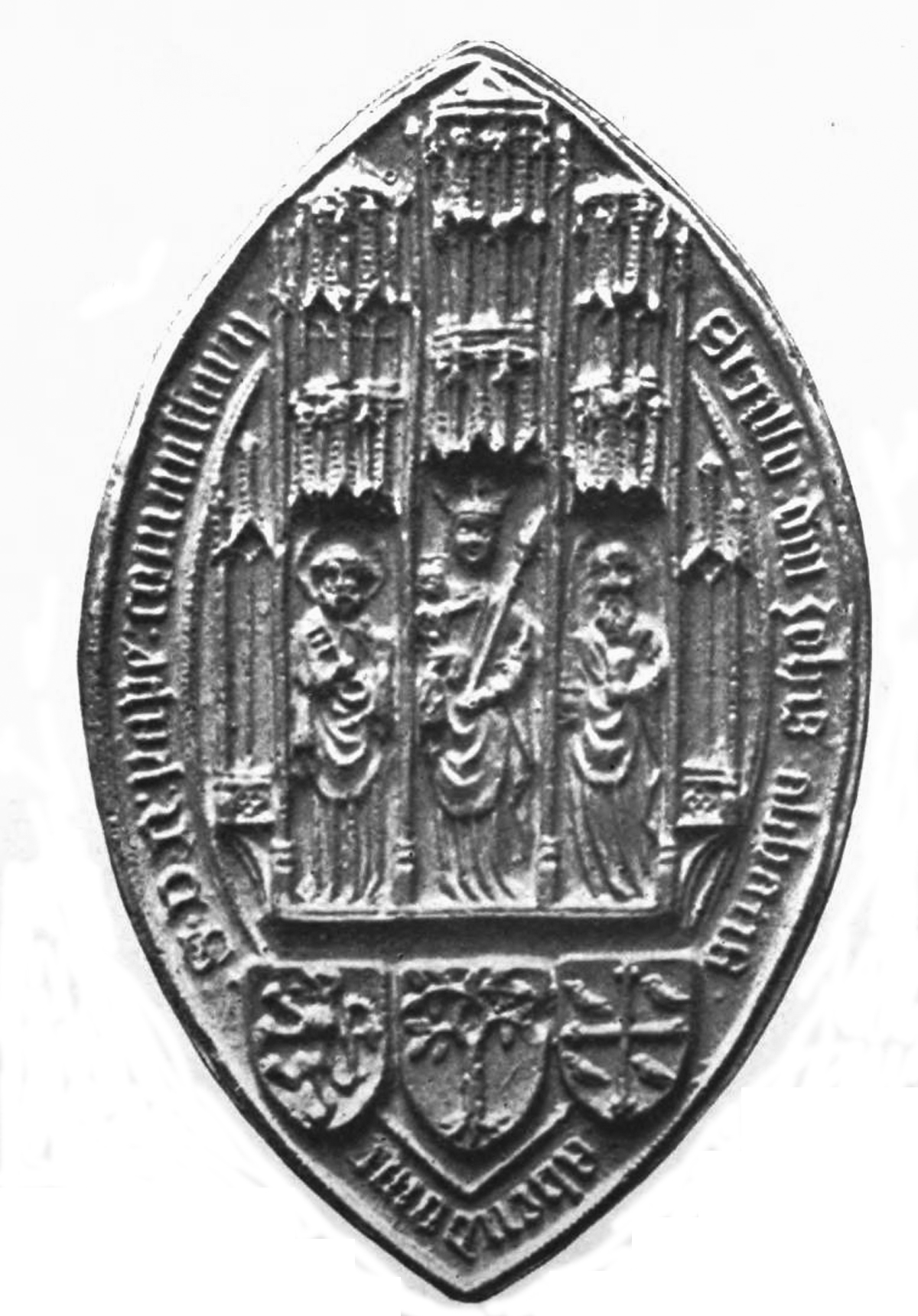
Another abbey seal, belonging to John Sante

The historic abbots, right up to the dissolution of the abbey in 1538, are as follows:

Name	In office	Comments
Saint Æthelwold of Winchester	c. 955 – c. 964	later Bishop of Winchester
Osgar	c. 964 – 984	
Eadwine	985 – 990	
Wulfgar	990 – 1016	
Æthelsige	1016 – 1018	
Æthelwine	1018 – 1030	
Siward	1030 – 1044	
Æthelstan	c. 1044 – 1047/1048	
Spearhafoc	c. 1047/1048 – 1051	a famous goldsmith, later Bishop-Elect of London, who absconded with a large treasure
Rodulf	1051 – 1052	
Ordric	1052 – 1066	
Ealdred	1066 – 1071	
Adelelm	1071 – 1083	Norman abbot
Rainald	1084 – 1097	Norman abbot
Faritius	1100 – 1117	Norman abbot
vacant	1117 – 1121	
Vincent	1121 – 1130	
Ingulph	1130 – 1159	
Walkelin	1159 – 1164	
vacant	1164 – 1165	held by the king
none	1165 – 1175	held in commendam by Godfrey, bishop of St Asaph
vacant	1175	
Roger	1175 – 1185	
vacant	1185 – 1186	vacant for half a year
Alvred	1186 – 1189	
Hugh	1189/1190 – c. 1221	
Robert of Hendred (Henreth)	1221 – 1234	
Luke	1234 – 1241?	
John de Blosmeville	1241 – 1256	
William of Newbury	1256 – 1260	
Henry of Frilford (Frilleford)	1260 – 1261	
Robert of Hendred	1261 – 1289	
Nicholas of Culham	1289 – 1306	
Richard of Bishops Cleeve	1306 – 1315	
John of Sutton	1315 – 1322	
John de Canyng (Canynges)	1322 – 1328	
Robert of Garford	1328 – 1332	
William (of Cumnor (Comenor(e))	1332 – 1335	
Roger of Thame (Tame)	1335 – 1361	
Peter of Hanney	1361 – 1399	
Richard de Salford	1401	
John Dorset	1415	
Richard Boxore	1421/2 – 1427	
Thomas Salford	1427	
Ralph Hamme	1428 – 1435	
William Ashendon	1435	
John Sante	1468	
Thomas Rowland	1496	
Alexander Shottisbrook	1504	
John Coventry	1508	
Thomas Pentecost (= Rowland)	1511/1512 – 1538	
