= Ealdred of Abingdon =

Ealdred, Abbot of Abingdon.

Ealdred, also called Brihtwine, was a monk and provost at Abingdon before becoming abbot in 1066; he was later implicated in the conspiracy of Bishop Æthelwine of Durham, and was deposed in 1071. At first imprisoned in Wallingford Castle, he was later transferred to the custody of Bishop Walkelin of Winchester, where he remained for the rest of his life.
