= Historia Ecclesie Abbendonensis =

12th-century English monastic chronicle

- Also known as: History of the Church of Abingdon; Chronicon Monasterii de Abingdon; Abingdon Chronicle
- Author(s): unknown
- Compiled by: unknown
- Language: Medieval Latin
- Date: c. 1164
- Provenance: Abingdon Abbey
- Genre: Chronicle-cartulary
- Subject: Abingdon Abbey
- Setting: Anglo-Norman England
- Period covered: c. 700–1154

The Historia Ecclesie Abbendonensis or History of the Church of Abingdon (sometimes known by its older printed title of Chronicon Monasterii de Abingdon or occasionally as the Abingdon Chronicle) was a medieval chronicle written at Abingdon Abbey in England in the 12th century. The Abbey was historically in the county of Berkshire, but since 1974 has been in the county of Oxfordshire.

== Background ==
The Historia is one of a number of monastic histories written during the middle and later parts of the 12th century, when a number of monasteries produced works devoted to recording the histories of their monasteries and local areas. In the south, these included the Liber Eliensis of Ely Abbey, the Chronicon Abbatiae Rameseiensis of Ramsey Abbey, the Chronicon Angliae Petriburgense of Peterborough Abbey, a history of the see of Bath and Wells, and the Chronicon Monasterii de Bello of Battle Abbey. The northern histories produced foundation stories of the various Cistercian houses, along with other works. The southern works, including the Chronicon, are mainly concerned with the various controversies that their religious houses were involved in. The northern histories are less concerned with controversy, and overall are more prone to hagiography.

== Authorship and contents ==
The History of the Church of Abingdon was written by an anonymous author, probably a monk of the Abbey. The History covers approximately 400 years, from the time of King Ine of Wessex (to whom the first charter in the History is dated in 699) to the end of the reign of King Stephen in 1154.

Little is known of the author of the document, other than that he was a monk of the Abbey and that he had entered by 1117. According to Sir Frank Stenton, this timing is suggested by the presence of certain passages that are apparently contemporary with Abbot Faritius, who died that year, and is referred to several times in the first person by the author: “Moreover, we were without an Abbot for four years” and, again concerning Faritius, “we saw him buy more than sixty silk cloths”. Hudson, however, infers that the text may have been revised in the 1160s.

== Documentation ==
Whilst the earliest surviving text of the History is the Cotton Claudius C IX in the British Library, it has been suggested by Stenton and John Hudson that the author drew upon previously extant works, notably the Anglo-Saxon Chronicle, Wulfstan's Life of St. Æthelwold and possibly a now-lost Book of Commemorations. The Chronicle of John of Worcester was also apparently used; Hudson states “An Abingdon manuscript of John of Worcester, in the same hand as the History, does survive”.

== Themes ==
A particular concern in the Historia is the legendary foundation of the abbey, and the author stressed the fact that the abbey was founded much earlier than its refoundation by Æthelwold in the 10th century. He based his account in the Historia on Geoffrey of Monmouth's work Historia Regum Britanniae, tracing the first foundation of Abingdon to an Irish monk supposedly named Abbennus, who founded the abbey on the Mount of Abbennus in Berkshire. Other sources besides Geoffrey of Monmouth included Ælfric's Vita Sancti Æthelwoldi. Also included was a list of the abbey's relics that had originally been compiled by Abbot Faricius.

However, up until the Norman Conquest, the History is primarily concerned with charters and land documents; indeed, Gransden has described it as “little more than an inflated cartulary”. There are rare narrative sections concerning major events, presumably drawn from various chronicles, as mentioned above.

One important part of the Historia is the description of the collapse of one of the abbey church's towers in 1091. The chronicle records that the monks were celebrating matins, which would normally have been done in the abbey church, but on this occasion, the prior had decided to have the office celebrated in the chapter house instead, which allowed all the monks to escape the collapse unharmed.

The Author, although unknown, displays certain partisan opinions of some events. Presumably a monk of English descent (as he could read the Old English of the Anglo-Saxon Chronicle), he displays a certain hostility to the Danes but not a particularly hostile one towards Normans in general, except to those who cause the Abbey to suffer, such as the “Imperious Queen” Matilda. In general, as might be expected, he is hostile to all who oppose the Abbey.

== Land Laws ==
The history, in its recording of the various land disputes of concern to the Abbey, refers numerous times to Charters or “land-books”. These were the basis by which land was granted to the Abbey or another individual, usually confirmed by the King in front of witnesses. The volume of witnesses at two of King Edward's Charters in 1052 (Earls Harold, Leofric and Siward, and four bishops) concerning four hides at Sandford and five hides at Chilton respectively, bears out the importance of witnesses, and also the likelihood of a Royal Court where the charters were signed and witnessed.

There was a practice of leasing land to laymen for “two or three generations”. The Abbey often experienced difficulties in reclaiming such lands. The History points out that during King Edward's reign this “custom got out of control, to considerable future damage”. This is perhaps an allusion to the problems that the Abbey faced when it came to trying to recover Abbey land from later Norman settlers.

There is one explicit example of "an Assembly of high-ranking men" possibly analogous to the land-court of the Abbot after the Norman Conquest.

The power of the Abbey is highlighted in certain episodes, such as “the Earl Harold’s favour that the Abbot enjoyed in this matter” and the importance of Abbot Ealdred making oaths of loyalty to King William in 1066. The wealth of the Church is inferred by various episodes of looting that went on immediately following the Conquest, one, notably by William's Queen, Matilda of Flanders, and by the calculation of its holding of 624½ hides in 1066 by Hollister. By 1086 this had fallen to 425 1/4 hides. For instance, the Abbot was unable to recover lands seized by Henry de Ferrers in the wake of the Conquest.

== What the History tells us about Anglo-Saxon society ==
From the History one can discern evidence of a strong English monarchy prior to 1066, with a recognised legal system of charters for land. The diversity of witnesses to the charters bears evidence to a royal court, where magnates from around the country gathered at certain times. The wealth and power of the abbey, and its role in temporal affairs is prominent. Nor is the church afraid to use ecclesiastical powers to get its way, as in the excommunication of Brithwine who had argued with the abbey over land in the 1050s. Equally, however, whilst the charters frequently feature colourful religious threats against breakers of the charter, there is no temporal threat or enforcement. For example, “If anyone brings forth into the open any document previously drawn up with the ink of false greed against this one drawn up above, let it profit neither him nor his avarice, but pierced in perpetuity by a divine sword”, from a charter of Æthelred II.

Immediately following the Conquest in 1066, it is inferred that there was a period of disorder, during which the abbey was looted and “devastation was dispensed indiscriminately throughout the villages”. One might safely presume, therefore that such disorder was more unusual under the Anglo-Saxons.

== Printing history ==
The Historia has been published in two editions. One, titled Chronicon Monasterii de Abingdon and containing just the Latin text, was edited by Joseph Stevenson in two volumes and published by the Rolls Series, London in 1858. A newer edition, with a translation, has appeared in two volumes, edited by John Hudson and published by Oxford University Press under their Oxford Medieval Texts series. The second volume appeared first in print, published in 2002. The first volume was published in 2007.
