= Faritius =

Italian Benedictine Abbot and physician (died 1117)

Faritius (also known as Faricius) (died 1117) was an Italian Benedictine Abbot of Abingdon and physician.

== Life ==
Faricius was born in Arezzo, Tuscany, a Benedictine monk who became known as a skilful physician and man of letters. He was in England in 1078, when he witnessed the translation of the relics of St. Aldhelm, and was cellarer of Malmesbury Abbey when, in 1100, he was elected abbot of Abingdon. He owed his election to a vision, reported to the king Henry I; Faricius was either already, or was soon afterwards, the king's physician.

He was consecrated on 1 November by Robert Bloet, bishop of Lincoln. The restoration of the conventual buildings was his first care, and he also rebuilt a large part of the church, probably the whole of the eastern end, the transepts, and the central tower, placing his new building to the south of St. Æthelwold's church He enriched the abbey by obtaining grants of land and gifts, caused books of divinity and medicine to be copied for the library, was liberal to the monks, and raised their number from twenty-eight to eighty. The payments he received for his work as a physician enabled him to do all this.

When, after the see of Canterbury had remained vacant for five years, Henry held a council at Windsor on 26 April 1114 in order to fix on a successor to Anselm, he was anxious to procure the election of Faricius. The suffragan bishops, however, opposed the scheme, for they were afraid that Faricius as an Italian and a strict churchman would involve the church in fresh disputes. This feeling was not expressed openly, but the Bishops of Lincoln and Salisbury alleged that it would be unseemly that a physician who attended women should be made archbishop. The king gave up the point, and Ralph d'Escures was elected.

== Works ==
He wrote a ‘Life of St. Aldhelm,’ which is criticised by William of Malmesbury in his ‘Life’ of the saint. His work is identified as the anonymous ‘Life’ in the contemporary Cotton MS. Faustina, B. iv., which is printed in the Bollandists' Acta Sanctorum May vi. 84, and by John Allen Giles in his edition of Aldhelm's works. He is also said to have written letters and a work proving that infants dying without baptism cannot be saved, and was sent a letter on this subject by Theobald of Étampes.
