= Abingdon Abbey =

Benedictine monastery also known as St Mary's Abbey located in Abingdon

Coordinates: 51°40′14″N 1°16′31″W

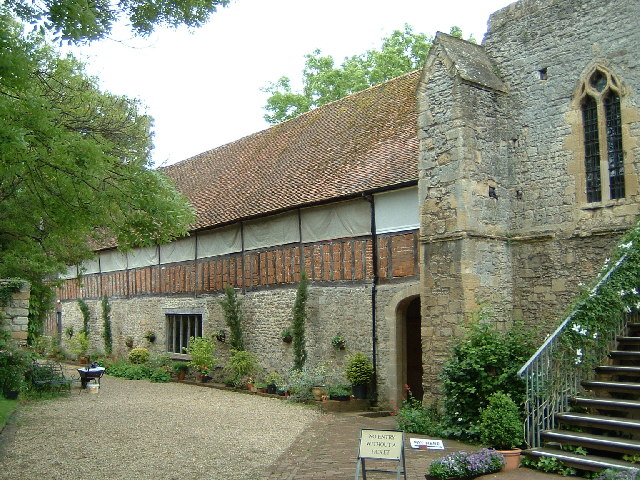
The Long Gallery at Abingdon Abbey.

Abingdon Abbey (formally Abbey of Saint Mary) was a Benedictine monastery in Abingdon-on-Thames in the modern county of Oxfordshire in the United Kingdom. Situated near to the River Thames, it was founded in c. 675 AD and was dedicated to Mary, mother of Jesus. It was disestablished in 1538 during the dissolution of the monasteries. A few physical remnants of the Abbey buildings survive within Abingdon-on-Thames.

== History ==
=== Early history ===
The name ‘Abingdon’ until the post Norman era related to an area of nearby Boars Hill, and it is thought the institution originated in that location, before relocating south to the valley location near the minster at what was originally known as Helenstowe.

The abbey is thought to have been founded in 675 either by Cissa, viceroy of Centwine, king of the West Saxons, or by his nephew Hean, in honour of the Virgin Mary, for twelve Benedictine monks. Cissa was buried at the abbey.

Endowed by successive West Saxon kings, it grew in importance and wealth until its destruction by the Danes in the reign of King Alfred, and the sequestration of its estates by Alfred because the monks had not made him a sufficient requital for vanquishing their enemies. By the 950s the abbey was in a decayed state, but in about 954 King Eadred appointed Æthelwold, later Bishop of Winchester, abbot. He was one of the leaders of the English Benedictine Reform, and Abingdon then became the second centre of the Reform (after Glastonbury). There is a collection of 136 charters granted to this abbey by various Saxon kings. (Note: See Eadwig's Charter to Abingdon Abbey c.957) The Domesday Book of 1086 states that the abbey was a wealthy and powerful landowner. (Note: "At the time Æthelwold (afterwards Bishop of Winchester) took charge, the abbey was in a ruinous and impoverished condition". (Note: See Abingdon Abbey > History > Early history > By the 950s the abbey was in a decayed state, but in about 954 King Eadred appointed Æthelwold, later Bishop of Winchester, abbot. He was one of the leaders of the English Benedictine Reform, and Abingdon then became the second centre of the Reform (after Glastonbury).) In the course of Æthelwold's nine year rule, and as re-established and largely rebuilt by him, the abbey became the first of the Benedictine houses in England to undergo reform". "From Æthelwold's time onwards its prosperous days may be reckoned, and during the next century or so great wealth was accumulated. In Domesday its possessions in Berks were given as second only in extent to the King's" – PDF page 5, actual page 27.) (Note: "There Æthelwold founded [in c.954 AD] – re-founded as he saw it – a monastery, staffed by former inmates of Glastonbury Abbey and clergy from London and Winchester, and was ordained its abbot. Abingdon subsequently received extensive grants of land from King Eadred and from Queen Eadgifu, Eadred's mother.")

The Chronicle of the Monastery of Abingdon (Historia Ecclesie Abbendonensis) was written at the abbey in the twelfth century.

=== Sutton Courtenay ===
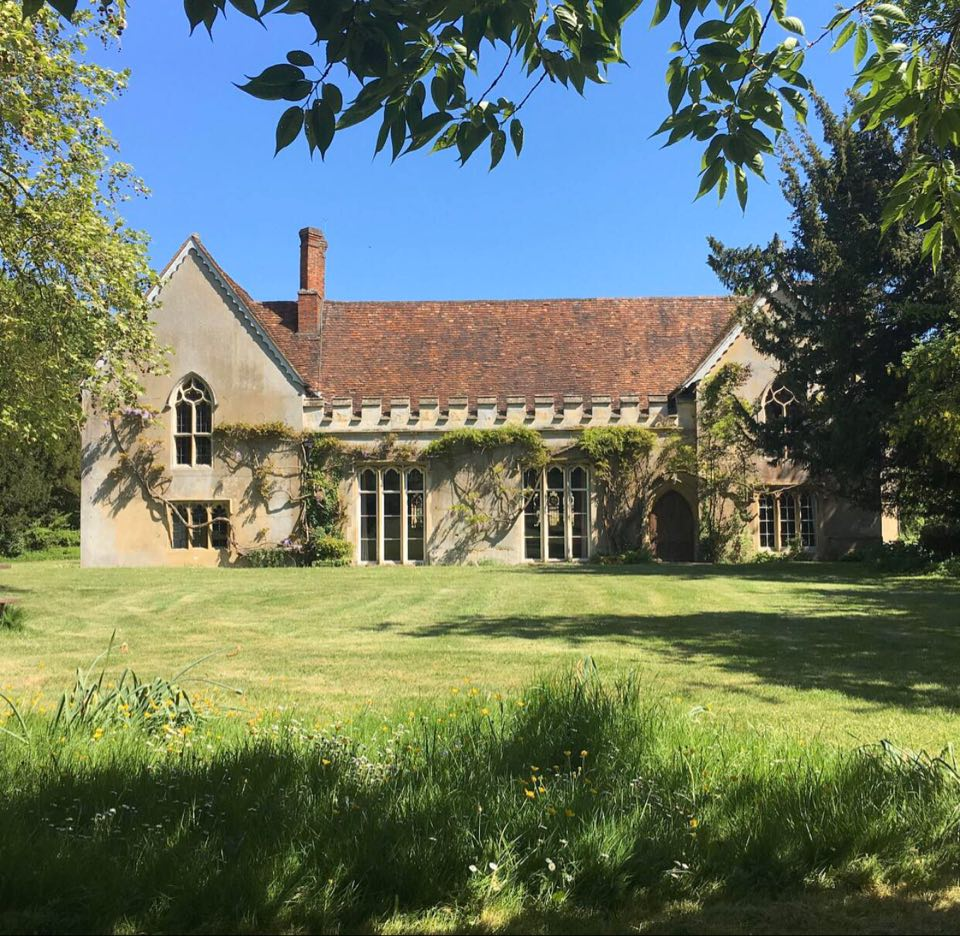
The Abbey, Sutton Courtenay, was the rectory of the abbey.

In Sutton Courtenay, Abingdon Abbey constructed The Abbey as a monastic grange, used as an administrative centre for the abbey's land and tithe holdings. However, the owner of the hide of land, Alwin the priest (whose father owned the land before him), agreed with the abbot that he should retain Sutton with reversion first to his son and thereafter to the abbey, on condition of giving in Milton chapelry immediately. Almost certainly in the late twelfth century, Abingdon Abbey took two thirds of the tithes and the rector the remaining third. In 1258, following a dispute, the land was formally appropriated to the abbey and a vicarage was ordained. As it was close to Abingdon Abbey, it was probably run by the monks themselves rather than being left to a steward.

In 1278 Hugh de Courtenay, Lord of the Manor of Sutton, sued the abbey for advowson. In 1284 an allegedly biased jury was empanelled, presided over by Solomon of Rochester, the chief justice of the eyre. It found unexpectedly for Courtenay; Rochester himself was the first to be presented by the Courtenays.

Subsequently the abbot of Abingdon Abbey alleged that in 1290 Rochester had seized the goods at the rectory belonging to the abbey. He also claimed that Solomon had extorted 40 marks from the abbey for alleged dilapidations to the rectory house. He was not convicted of any offence.

=== Abbots ===
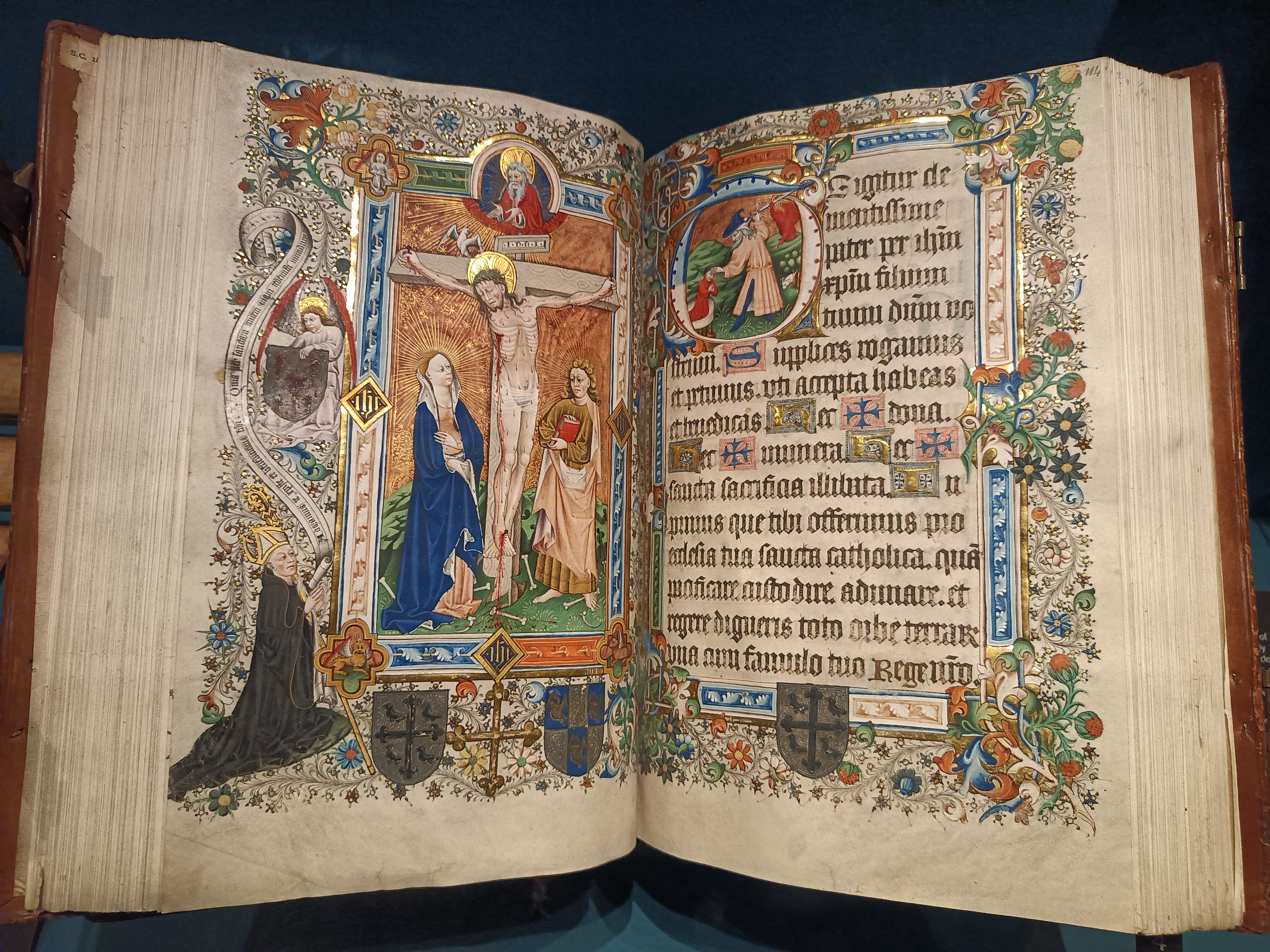
The "Abingdon Missal", dated to 1461, depicts the donor and the Abbey's abbot William Ashenden kneeling to the bottom left of the crucifixion. The manuscript is held by the Bodleian Library, Oxford.

Abbots after the Norman Conquest included Faritius, physician to Henry I of England (1100–17), and Richard of Hendred, for whose appointment the King's consent was obtained in 1262. He was present at the Council of Lyon in 1272. The last abbot was Thomas Pentecost alias Rowland, who was among the first to acknowledge the Royal Supremacy. With the rest of his community he signed the surrender of his monastery in 1538, receiving the manor of Cumnor for life or until he had preferment to the extent of £223 per annum. The revenues of the abbey (26 Hen. VIII) were valued at £1876, 10s, 9d.

=== Burials ===
Ælfric of Abingdon was originally buried here, before being translated to Canterbury Cathedral. Sideman, Bishop of Crediton, was buried here, too, as were Margaret, Countess of Pembroke, and Fulk FitzRoy.

Other burials

- Robert D'Oyly and his wife Ealdgyth
- Siward (Abbot of Abingdon)
- Ralph Basset and his father Thurston Ralph Bassett
- John Grey, 2nd Viscount Lisle
- Margaret, Countess of Pembroke
- Mary of Waltham

== Extant buildings ==
There is nothing to see today of the abbey church. Apparent ruins in the Abbey Gardens are Trendell's Folly, built in the nineteenth century. Some of the stones may come from St Helen's Church.

Associated monastic buildings do, however, survive, including the Abbey Exchequer, the timber-framed Long Gallery, the abbey bakehouse, (all in the care of the Friends of Abingdon Civic Society) the abbey gateway, St John's hospitium (a pilgrims' hostel) and the Church of St Nicolas. One of the original fireplaces was removed and is now still intact in Lacies Court, Abingdon School.

The existing buildings include:

- Checker Hall (Unicorn Theatre)
- The Checker.
- The Long Gallery.
- The Lower Hall.
- Thames Street, the Mill and the Mill stream.
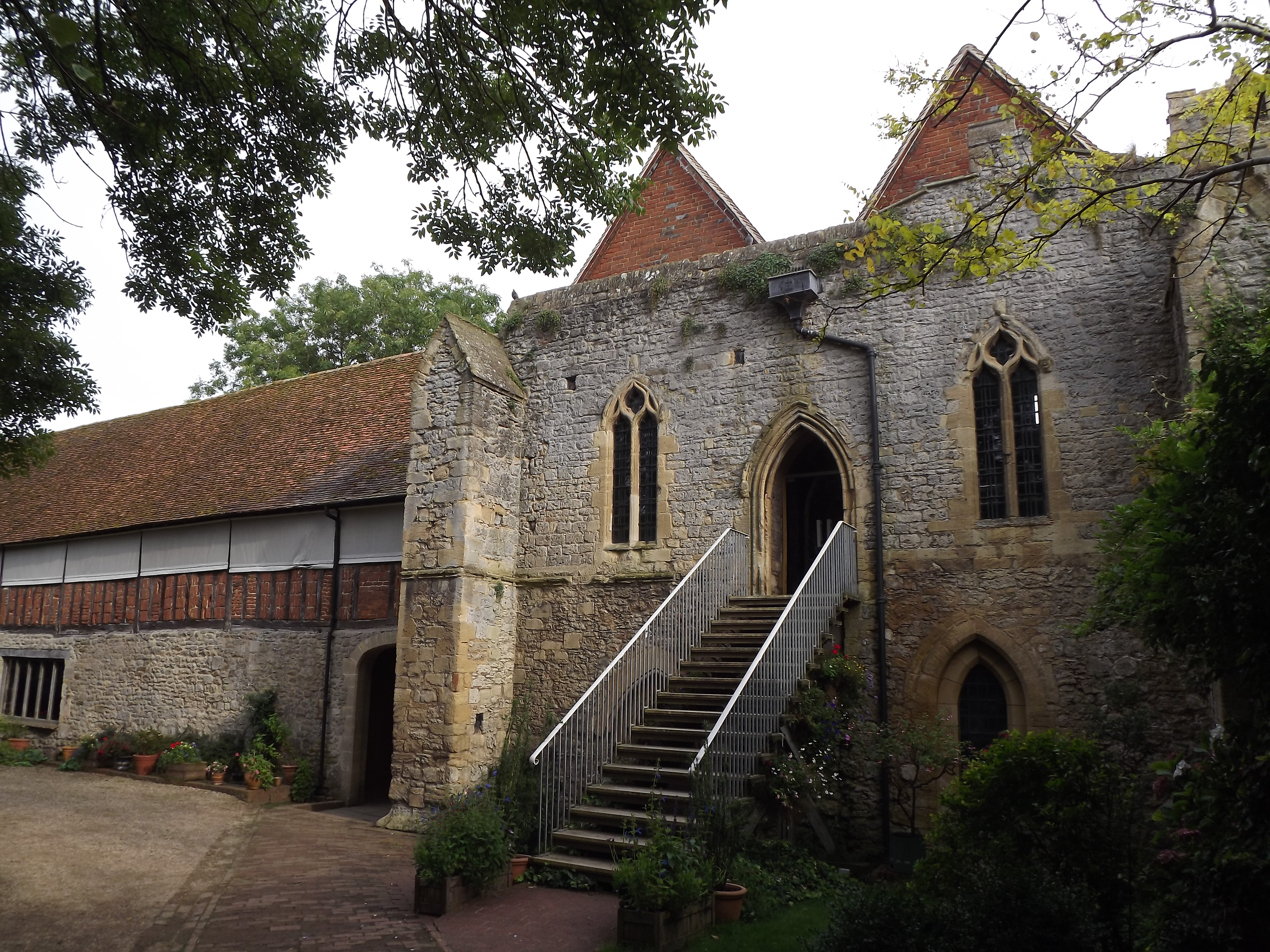
Long Gallery, Abingdon Abbey

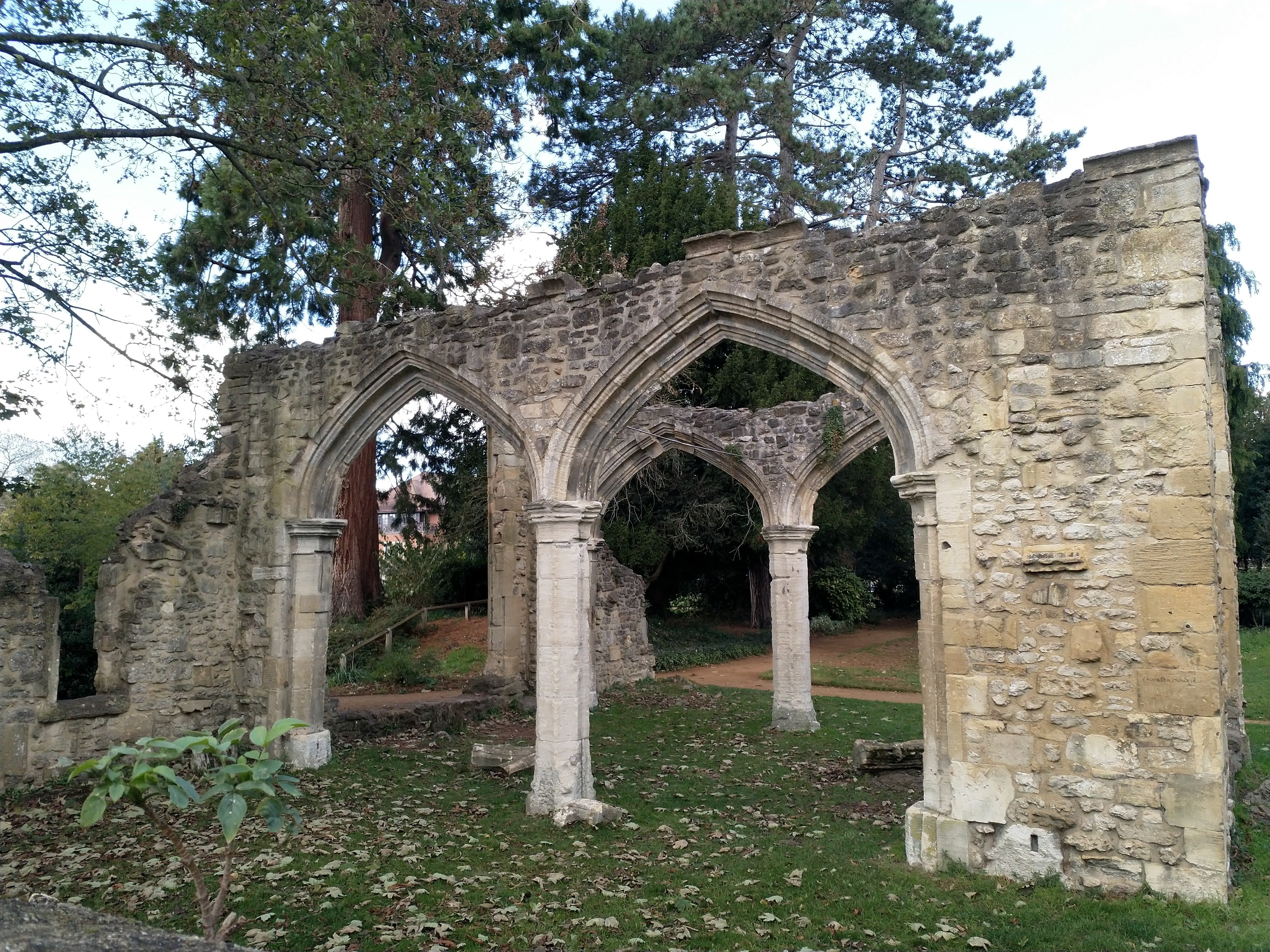
Trendell's Folly in the Abbey Gardens, dating to the 19th century. The Abbey Church was originally situated on this site.

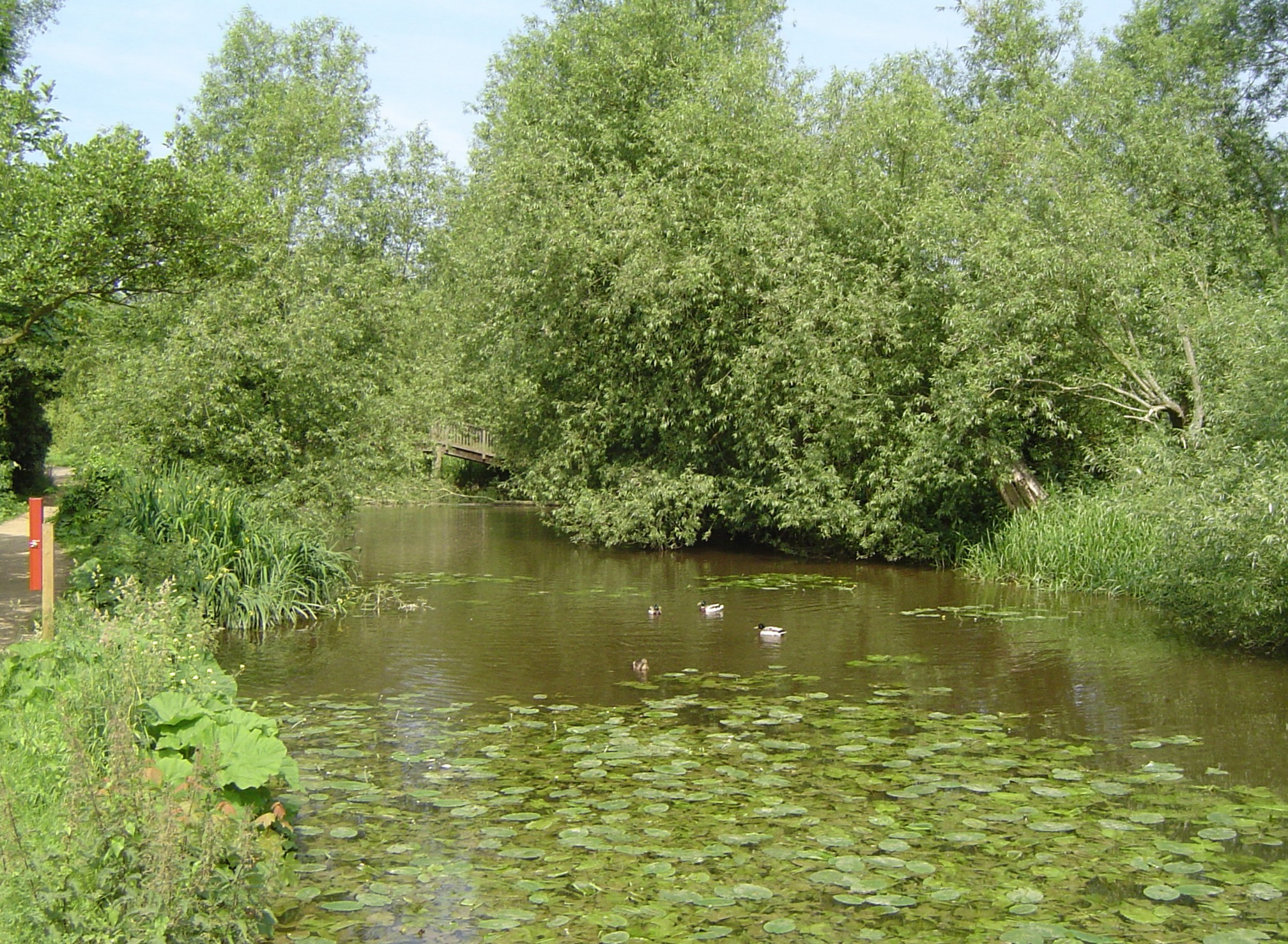
View from Abingdon Lock of the watercourse to the abbey cut by the monks between 955 and 963.

== See also ==
- Abbot of Abingdon
- Abingdon Monks' Map
- Cosener's House, a conference centre in the grounds of the abbey
- Abingdon School
