= Woodlands St Mary =

Coordinates: 51.470211°N 1.511869°W

- Village
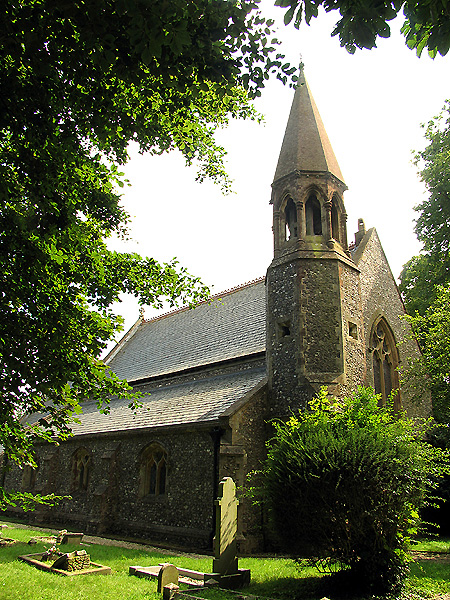
- St Mary's Church

- Location within Berkshire
- OS grid reference: SU339747
- Civil parish: Lambourn
- Unitary authority: West Berkshire
- Ceremonial county: Berkshire
- Region: South East
- Country: England
- Sovereign state: United Kingdom
- Police: Thames Valley
- Fire: Royal Berkshire
- Ambulance: South Central
- UK Parliament: Newbury

Woodlands St Mary is a small village in the English county of Berkshire. The village is situated in the civil parish of Lambourn, and is 3 miles (4.8 km) to the south of the village of Lambourn, and 1 mile (1.6 km) from Lambourn Woodlands. The parish is within the unitary authority of West Berkshire, close to the border between the counties of Berkshire and Wiltshire.

== Geography ==
Woodlands St Mary is located on the route of Ermin Way, the Roman road which connected Calleva Atrebatum (today's Silchester) to Glevum (Gloucester). The route of Ermin Way through the village is used by today's B4000 from Newbury to Lambourn. The modern M4 motorway passes just to the south of the village, with the nearest junction 14, about 2 miles (3.2 km) to the east, between Shefford Woodlands and Hungerford Newtown.

== Church ==
St Mary's church was built in 1851 and designed by the architect, Thomas Talbot Bury. It is a Grade II listed building.

== See also ==
- List of places in Berkshire
- Berkshire Downs
