= Croker's Hole =

Wildlife reserve

- Site of Special Scientific Interest
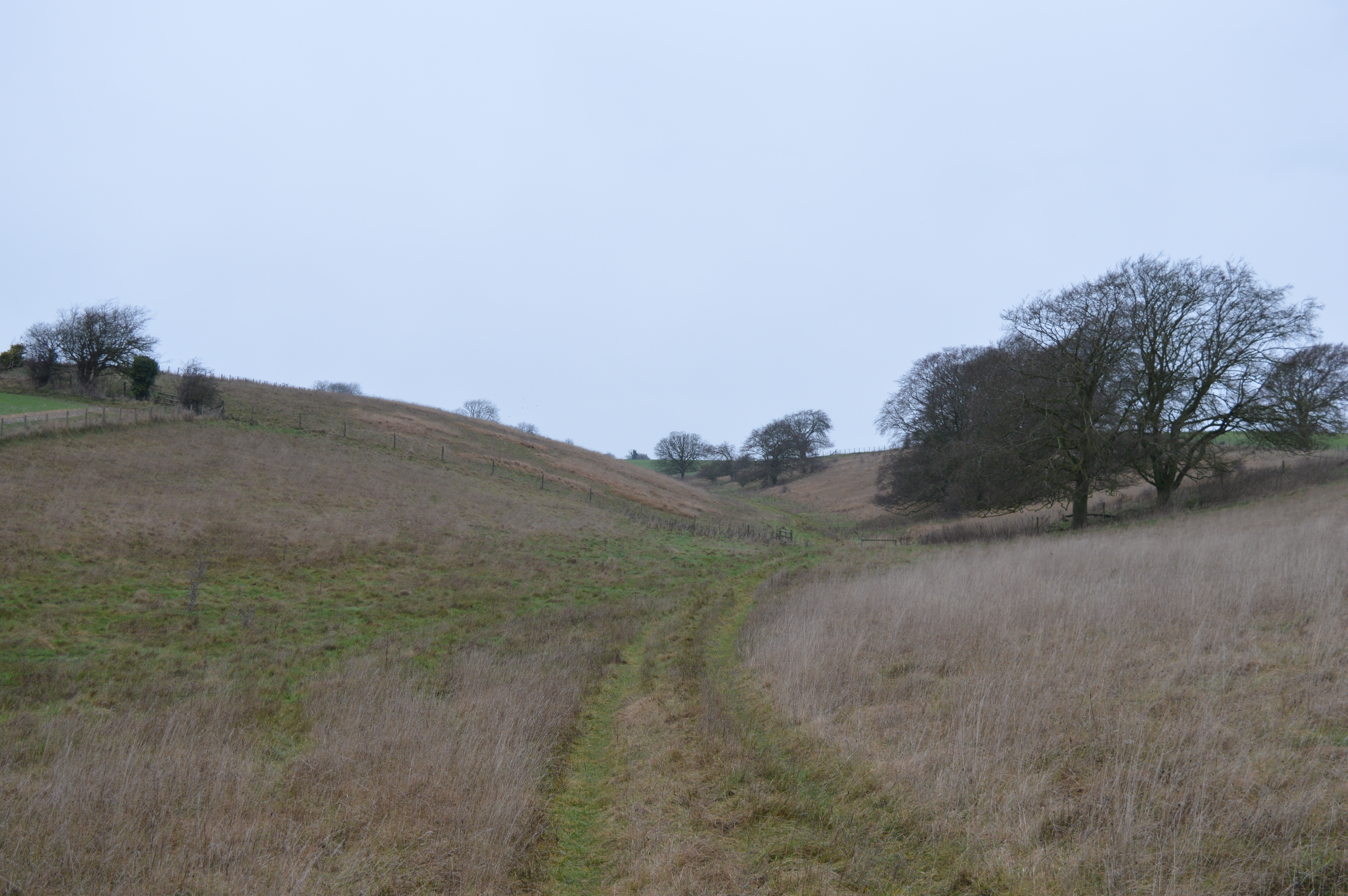

- Location within Berkshire
- Location of Croker's Hole.
- Area of search: Berkshire
- Grid reference: SU324820
- Coordinates: 51.5360°N 1.5343°W
- Interest: Biological
- Area: 4.4 hectares
- Notification date: 1991
- Location map: Magic Map

Croker's Hole is a 4.4-hectare (11-acre) biological Site of Special Scientific Interest north of Upper Lambourn in Berkshire.

The site is a narrow grassland valley, which is one of the most florally diverse chalk downlands in Berkshire. The dominant plants are upright brome and tor-grass, and it is the only site in the county which has the nationally scarce bastard toadflax.

There is access from a footpath from Seven Barrows to Hangman's Stone.
