= St Mary's Church, Lambourn Woodlands =

Coordinates: 51.4731°N 1.5207°W

St Mary's Church, Woodlands St. Mary
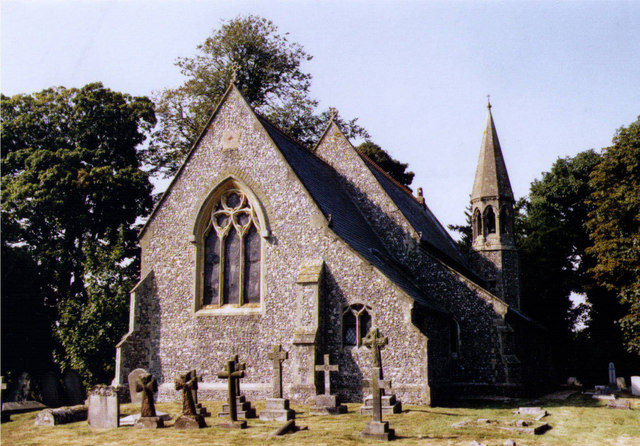
- St Mary's Church, Woodlands St. Mary, from the northeast

- Location in Berkshire
- OS grid reference: SU 334 749
- Location: Lambourn Woodlands, Berkshire
- Country: England
- Denomination: Anglican
- Website: Churches Conservation Trust

Architecture
- Functional status: Redundant
- Heritage designation: Grade II
- Designated: 11 June 1983
- Architect: Thomas Talbot Bury
- Architectural type: Church
- Style: Gothic Revival
- Completed: 1852

Specifications
- Materials: Flint with stone dressings Slate roofs

St Mary's Church is a redundant Anglican church in the hamlet of Lambourn Woodlands in the English county of Berkshire. It is recorded in the National Heritage List for England as a designated Grade II listed building, and is under the care of the Churches Conservation Trust. The church stands on the south side of the B4000 road, some 2 miles (3 km) south of Lambourn.

== History ==
The church was built in 1852 and designed by the architect Thomas Talbot Bury, a pupil of Augustus Charles Pugin, in Gothic Revival style. It was declared redundant on 1 June 1990, and was vested in the Churches Conservation Trust on 24 July 1991.

== Architecture ==
St Mary's is constructed in flint with stone dressings, and has slate roofs. Its plan is simple, consisting of a three-bay nave, a north aisle and a chancel. To the north of the west end is an octagonal spire. There are three two-light windows in Decorated style, and a three-light east window.

Inside the church is a three-bay arcade carried on octagonal piers. The chancel contains a sedilia and a piscina. The reredos was carved by John Bacon, whose son was the first parish priest.

== See also ==
- List of churches preserved by the Churches Conservation Trust in South East England
