= Bockhampton, Berkshire =

Abandoned village in Berkshire, England

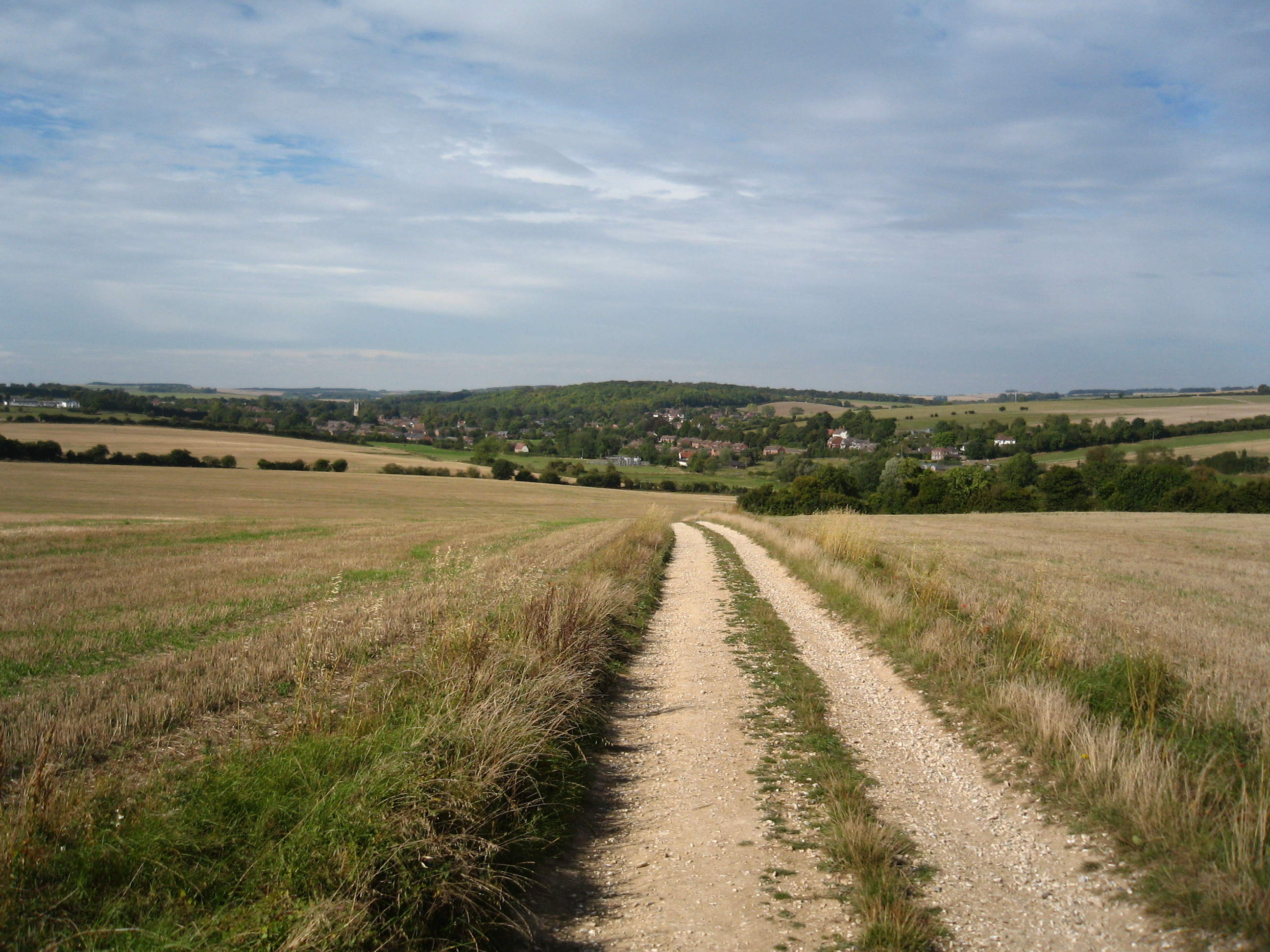
Footpath to Lambourn, Bockhampton would have been in the field directly ahead of the path, to the left of the substation.

Bockhampton (SU335782) is an abandoned village in Berkshire that was enclosed in the late 18th century. Situated on the River Lambourn southeast and downstream of Lambourn, it was also known as Lower Lambourn, as opposed to Upper Lambourn which is upstream. There is a road sign for Bockhampton on the Newbury Road pointing down Bockhampton Road towards the old site of the village in the sheep pasture next to the electricity substation.

== History ==
Bockhampton was mentioned in Domesday Book of 1086 as "Bochentone: Ralph the earl's son; Odo and Edward, king's thanes. Mill." who held the land in return for keeping the King's harriers.

Bockhampton Manor House was built in the 16th century by Thomas Blagrave (and subsequently rebuilt in the 17th and 18th centuries) and absorbed the three old manors of East Bockhampton, West Bockhampton and Hoppeshortland. The village was uprooted and the land enclosed in 1776 thanks to the Inclosure Act 1773, as sheep farming proved to be more profitable than tillage.

There was once a level crossing on the Lambourn Valley Railway, apparently named Bockhampton Crossing. This was about a mile from Lambourn station, and across the Lambourn-Newbury road, formerly the B4000 but now declassified. The crossing and its gates would have disappeared after the branch line closed down.

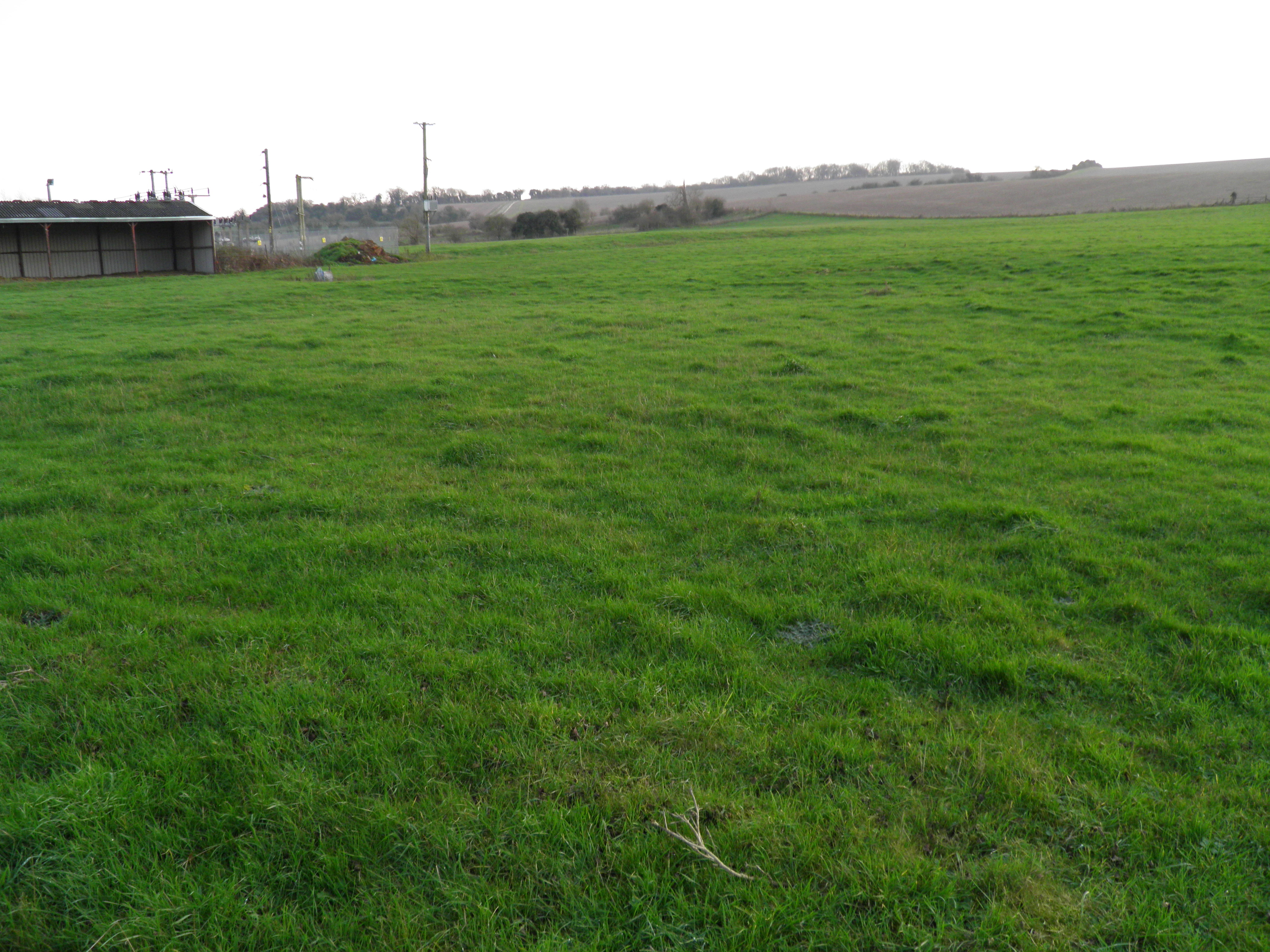
Site of the abandoned village of Bockhampton

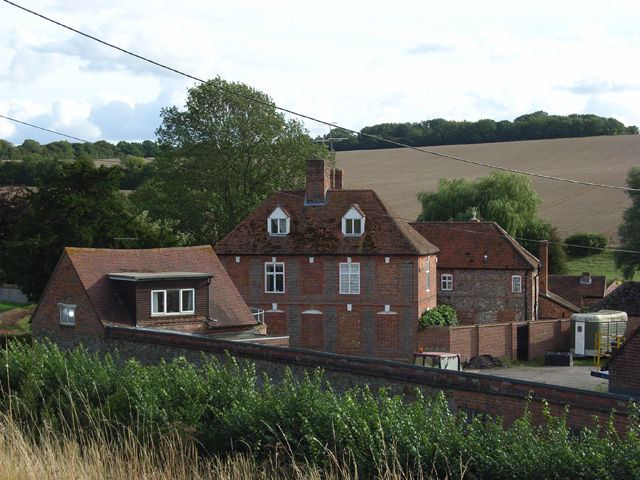
Bockhampton Manor House.

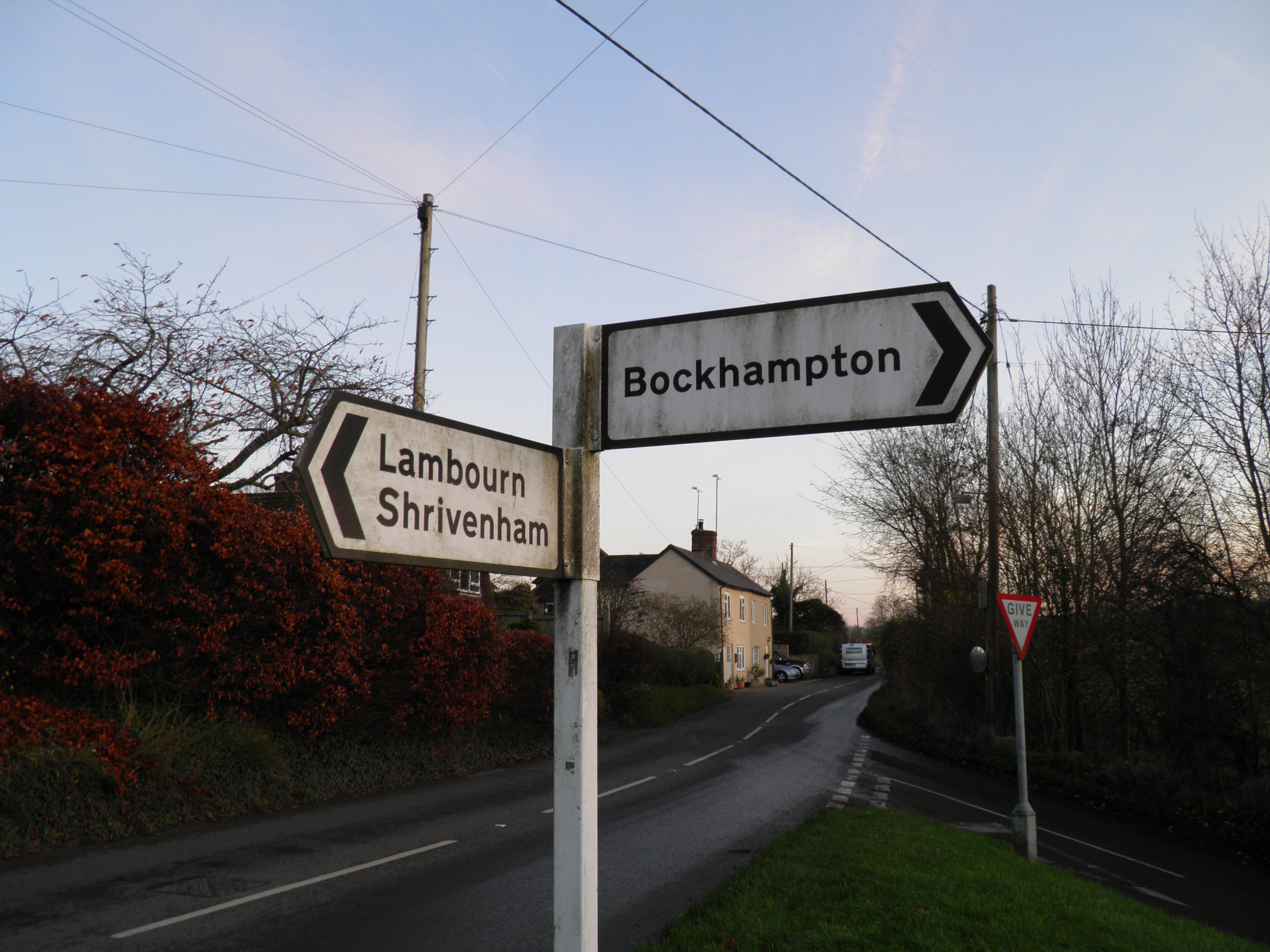
Signpost at top of Bockhampton Road leading to the abandoned village of Bockhampton
