= Frederick Bates (cricketer) =

English cricketer

Personal information
- Full name: Frederick Stanley Bates
- Born: 25 February 1899; Lambourn, Berkshire, England
- Died: 13 August 1969 (aged 70); Hammersmith, London, England
- Batting: Right-handed

Domestic team information
- Years: Team
- 1920: Hampshire

Career statistics
Competition	First-class
Matches	2
Runs scored	18
Batting average	6.00
100s/50s	–/–
Top score	9
Catches/stumpings	–/–
- Source: Cricinfo, 4 January 2010

Frederick Stanley Bates (25 February 1899 – 13 August 1969) was an English first-class cricketer and director of Odeon Cinemas from 1937 to 1950.

The son of H. D. Bates, he was born in February 1899 at Lambourn, Berkshire. He was educated at Marlborough College, where he played for the cricket eleven and the rugby fifteen. After completing his education at Marlborough, Bates served in the final year of the First World War, being commissioned as a second lieutenant into the Royal Garrison Artillery in January 1918. Following the war, he was promoted to lieutenant in July 1919. In the same year, Bates matriculated to Jesus College, Cambridge. In 1920, he made two appearances in first-class cricket for Hampshire in the County Championship against Essex and Somerset, with both matches played at Bournemouth. He scored 18 runs in his two matches, with a highest score of 9.

Bates was an associate of Odeon Cinemas founder Oscar Deutsch. He was director of the company from 1937 to 1950 and served as a joint-managing director alongside John Davis from 1942 to 1948. Bates died at Hammersmith in August 1969.
