= East Garston =

Coordinates: 51°29′10″N 1°28′34″W

- Village
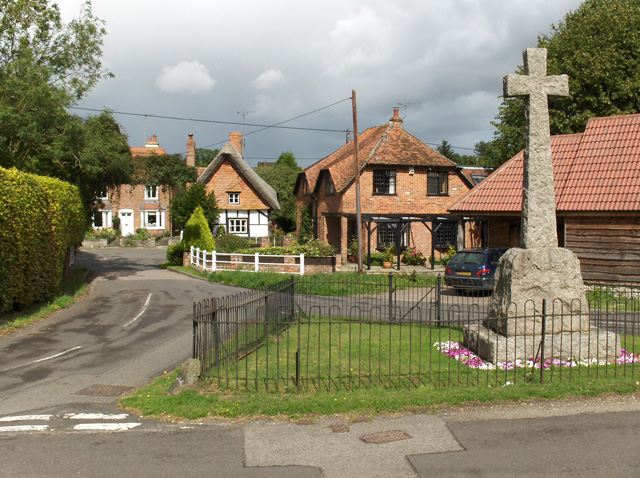
- Junction of Front Street, Back Street and Roger's Lane

- Location within Berkshire
- Area: 8.05 km^{2} (3.11 sq mi)
- Population: 459 (2011 census)
  - Density: 57/km^{2} (150/sq mi)
- OS grid reference: SU3676
- Civil parish: East Garston
- Unitary authority: West Berkshire
- Ceremonial county: Berkshire
- Region: South East
- Country: England
- Sovereign state: United Kingdom
- Post town: Hungerford
- Postcode district: RG17
- Dialling code: 01488
- Police: Thames Valley
- Fire: Royal Berkshire
- Ambulance: South Central
- UK Parliament: Newbury
- Website: The Berkshire Village of East Garston

East Garston is a village and civil parish on the River Lambourn, about 5.5 miles (8.9 km) north of Hungerford in West Berkshire. The river flows through the village, dividing many houses from the main road, so that each has a bridge over the river to the front door.

== Toponymy ==
East Garston was known by its earlier Saxon name Argeston until the end of the 19th century, and locals called the village Argeston into the early 20th century. The origin of the name is uncertain. It may have meant the "ton" of Esgar: a ton being a principal house for a lord, with surrounding dwellings for tenants.

== Government ==
The civil parish of East Garston comprises the village of East Garston, together with a considerable area of rural downland to the north and south. The parish has approximately 226 dwellings. In 2011 the population was 449, in an area of 4,500 acres (18 km^{2}). The parish has boundaries with the Berkshire parishes of Fawley, Great Shefford, Hungerford and Lambourn, and with the Oxfordshire parish of Letcombe Bassett.

== Notable people ==
- Charles Thomas Wooldridge, murderer and dedicatee of The Ballad of Reading Gaol by Oscar Wilde, was born in the village.

== Amenities ==
The Church of England parish church of All Saints is a flint built church dating back to the 12th century. Situated on the northwestern edge of the village, it is Grade II* listed. The East Garston Bellringers was re-formed in 1998.

The village has a village hall, social club and cricket club, and is the home of the Garston Gallopers, a mixed Morris dancing side. The Gallopers' colours are purple and green, the "village" colours from the school uniform and the racing colours of a prominent racehorse trainer from the village..

== Demography ==
2011 Published Statistics: Population, home ownership and extracts from Physical Environment, surveyed in 2005
Output area	Homes owned outright	Owned with a loan	Socially rented	Privately rented	Other	km^{2} roads	km^{2} water	km^{2} domestic gardens	Usual residents	km^{2}
Civil parish	51	47	48	33	4	0.08	0.0001	0.13	459	8.05

== Gallery of images ==
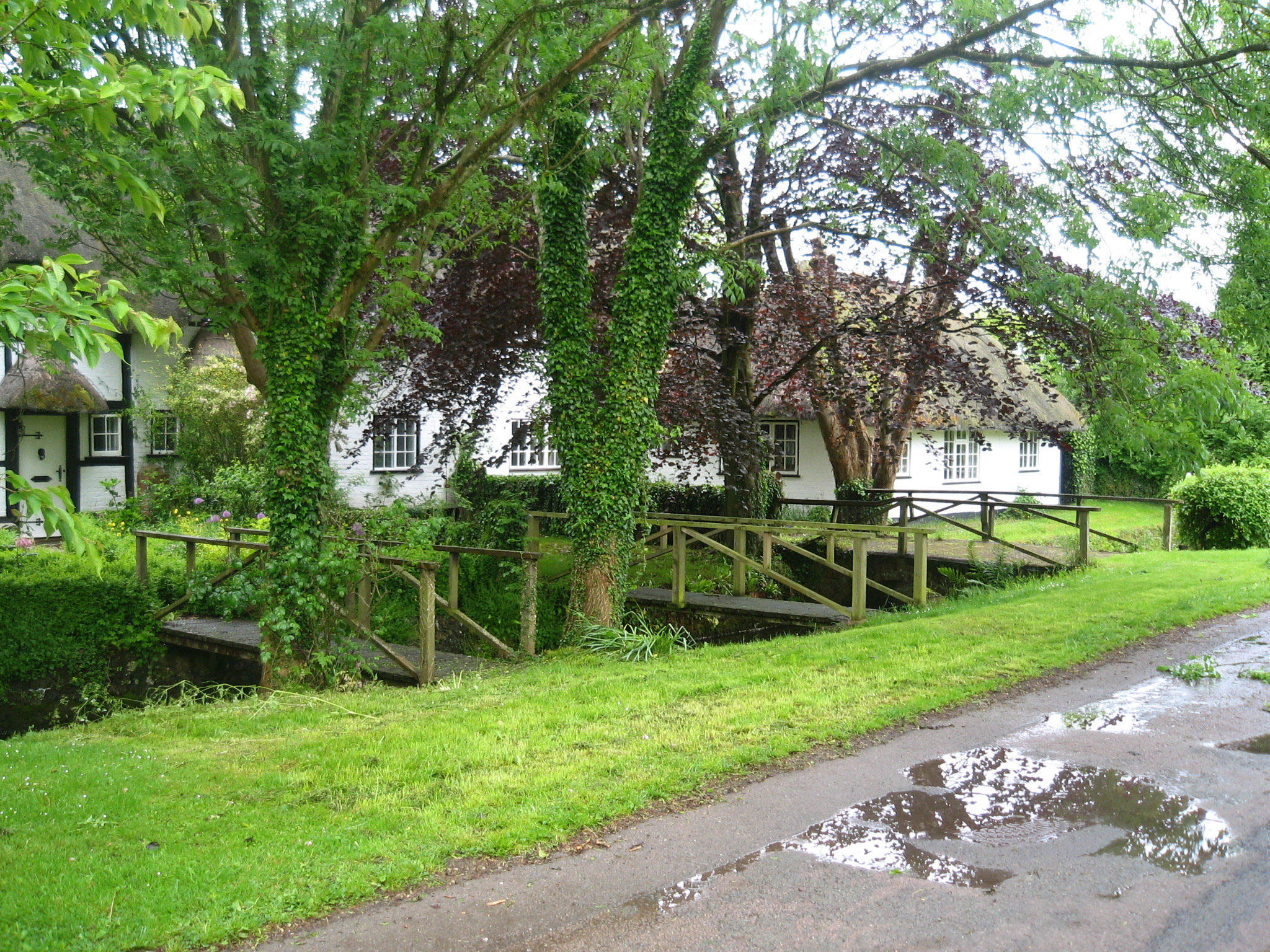
Bridges over the River Lambourn

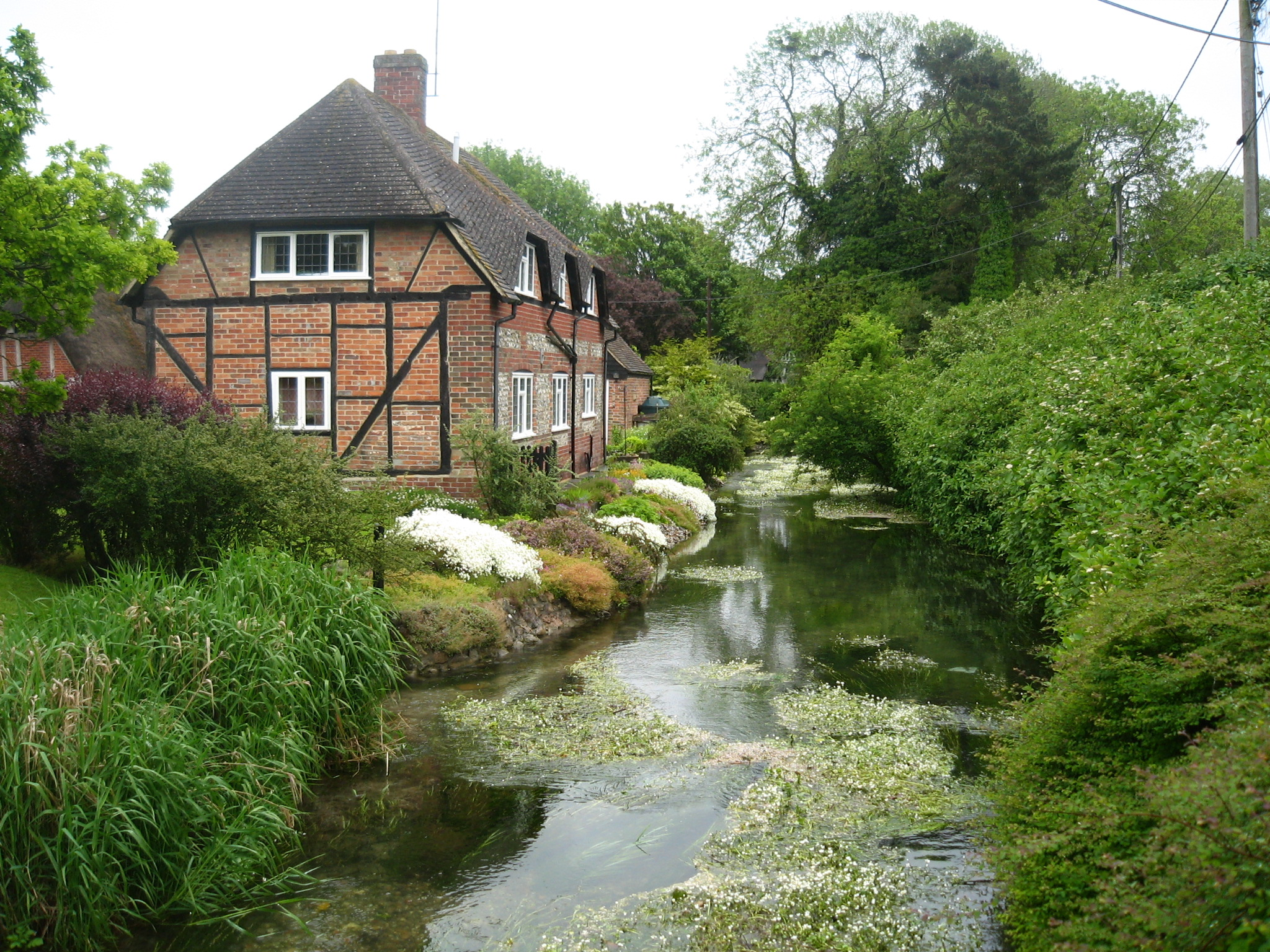
River Lambourn

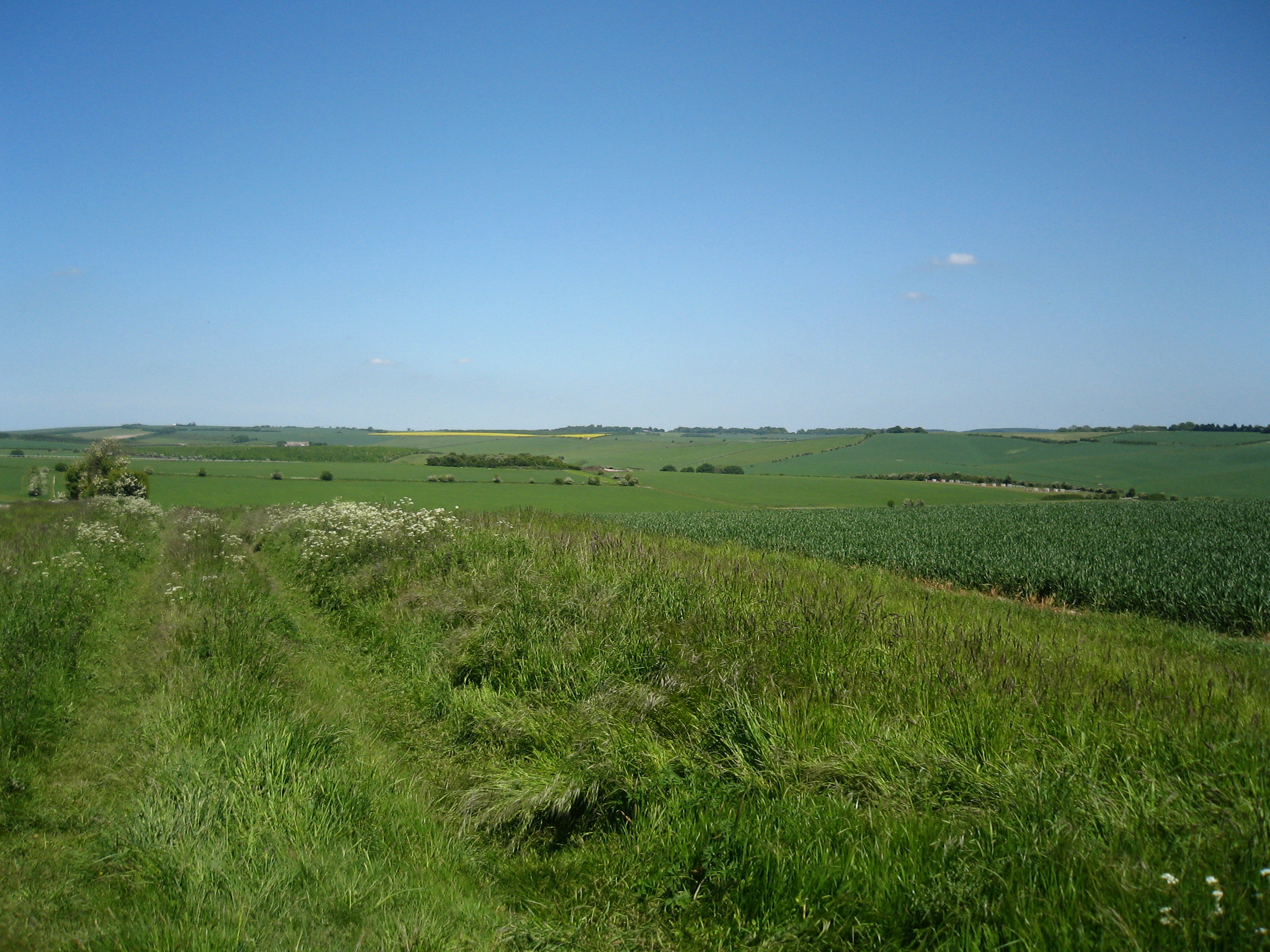
East Garston Down
