= Fognam Chalk Quarry =

Chalk quarry in Berkshire, England

- Site of Special Scientific Interest
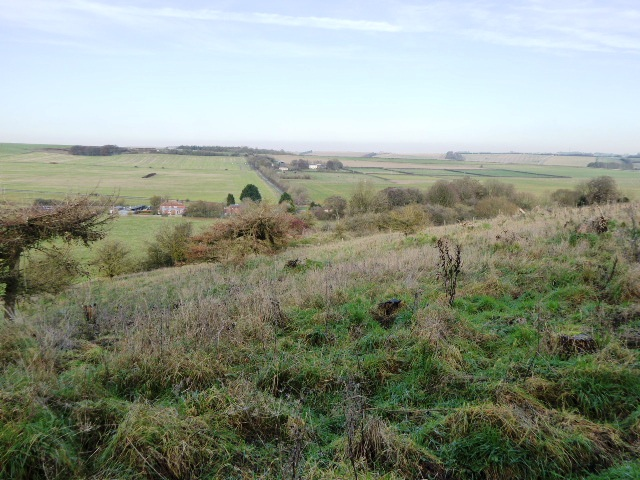
- View towards Fognam Chalk Quarry
- Location of Fognam Chalk Quarry.
- Area of search: Berkshire
- Grid reference: SU 297 799
- Coordinates: 51.517°N 1.575°W
- Interest: Geological
- Area: 3.0 hectares (7.4 acres)
- Notification date: 1985
- Location map: Magic Map

Fognam Chalk Quarry is a 3-hectare (7.4-acre) geological Site of Special Scientific Interest west of Upper Lambourn in Berkshire, England. It is a Geological Conservation Review site. It is in the North Wessex Downs.

The site is private land with no public access.

== Geology ==
The chalk rock was deposited about 80–90 million years ago; the quarry marks the junction between the Middle and Upper Chalk. The formation can be traced from Hertfordshire to Dorset, but the chalk of Berkshire is only about half the thickness seen in other locations, as it is thought that it was deposited over an area of relatively higher ground (the Berkshire-Chiltern Shelf, part of the London Platform) and therefore in shallower seas. This makes correlation with other formations difficult, due to the absence of certain marker beds, although dating from fossils in the quarry, particularly Middle and Upper Turonian ammonites associated with inoceramid bivalve assemblages, has been attempted.

== History ==
The chalk from this quarry was used locally to build houses.

== Fauna ==
The site has the following fauna:

=== Mammals ===
- Highland cattle

=== Invertebrates ===
- Small blue

== Flora ==
The site has the following flora:

- kidney vetch
- birdsfoot trefoil
- Lady's bedstraw
- cowslip
- mignonette
- rough hawkbit
- glaucous sedge
- common spotted orchid
- salad burnet
- greater knapweed
- yellow rattle
- fairy flax
- hoary plantain
- field scabious
