= Mehmet Kurt =

Turkish politician

Mehmet Kurt (born 1 January 1947, in Ceyhan, Turkey) is the son of Mehmet Kurt, who was Ceyhan's most significant and well known community leader and landowner.

Due to his father's untimely death, Mehmet Kurt assumed the leadership of the family businesses at the age of 21. He recognised immediately that his community needed employment, and he was responsible for the construction of three factories in Ceyhan, operating in the textiles and confectionery sectors. These were the first privately owned factories in this underdeveloped province of Turkey.

Kurt then moved to Istanbul where he built up his operations to export Ceyhan sourced cotton products to both Western and Eastern Europe. He also diversified the family enterprise into media, construction, energy, chemicals, defense, medical and the real estate sectors.

Amongst the most prominent real-estate projects controlled by Kurt is the landmark Marmara Sea Development Project, which includes offices, apartments and a shopping centre in the heart of Istanbul. Other estate holdings include commercial properties in Ceyhan and Istanbul.

== Racehorse training ==
Over the past 10 years, Kurt, has developed and perfected a new horse training system that prepares horses for racing. His innovation, Kurt Systems, develops the horses' muscles and tendons by training them on a conventional all-weather track, but with horses safely harnessed into a specialised 'car', which moves on a roof-rail system. Each 'car' reads vital health signs such as heart pace and respiratory behaviour. This high-tech system ensures that the horses are brought on 'injury free', as it removes jockey error from the training of young racehorses, the primary cause of injury. Kurt Systems is undergoing continual improvement at Mehmet Kurt's stud farms in Ceyhan and Istanbul.

On 28 January 2011, Kurt acquired Kingwood Stud in Lambourn, England. He is keen to bring equine related research and development and employment to the West Berkshire area. He also intends to become fully engaged in the future of the British horse racing scene.

== Other interests ==
Kurt remains active in the Ceyhan and Istanbul business communities, helping to generate skills and jobs, particularly seeking to help the most disadvantaged in society. His strong support for secularism and democracy in Turkey has not come without a cost. In early 2010, he was summoned to give testimony for alleged relations with renegade elements within the Turkish military. No charges were filed and he was completely exonerated.

Kurt has been president of Adanaspor and Ceyhanspor national football clubs.
