= Lambourn Woodlands =

Coordinates: 51.479170°N 1.537220°W

- Hamlet
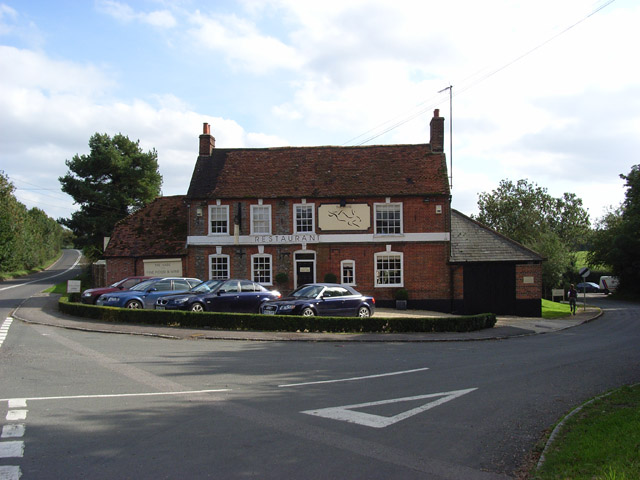
- The Hare

- Location within Berkshire
- OS grid reference: SU321757
- Civil parish: Lambourn
- Unitary authority: West Berkshire
- Ceremonial county: Berkshire
- Region: South East
- Country: England
- Sovereign state: United Kingdom
- Police: Thames Valley
- Fire: Royal Berkshire
- Ambulance: South Central
- UK Parliament: Newbury

Lambourn Woodlands is a hamlet in the English county of Berkshire. The village is situated in the civil parish of Lambourn, and is 2 miles (3.2 km) to the south of the village of Lambourn. The parish is within the unitary authority of West Berkshire, close to the border between the counties of Berkshire and Wiltshire.

== Geography ==
Lambourn Woodlands is located on the route of Ermin Way, the Roman road which connected Calleva Atrebatum (today's Silchester) to Glevum (Gloucester). The hamlet is in the triangle formed by the modern B4000 from Newbury to Lambourn and Hilldrop Lane. The former pub, the Hare and Hounds, is a Grade II listed building. The modern M4 motorway passes just to the south of the village, and its Membury service area is less than 1 mile (1.6 km) to the west. However the nearest motorway access point (J14) is some 3 miles (4.8 km) to the east, between Shefford Woodlands and Hungerford Newtown. The mast of the Membury transmitting station, adjacent to the service area, is visible from a considerable distance.

== See also ==
- List of places in Berkshire
- Berkshire Downs
