= Seven Barrows =

Archaeological site in Berkshire, England

- Site of Special Scientific Interest
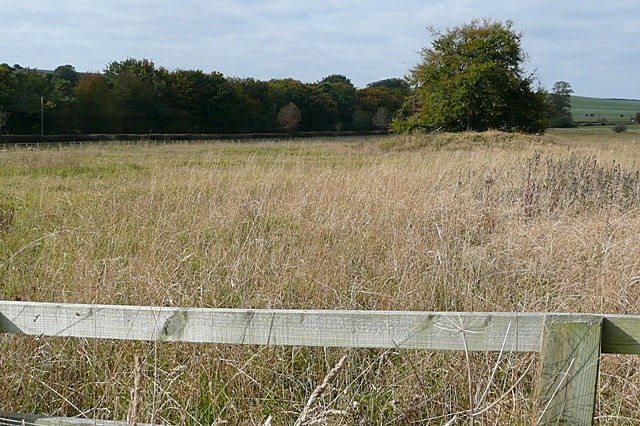

- Location within Berkshire
- Location of Seven Barrows.
- Area of search: Berkshire
- Grid reference: SU 328 828
- Coordinates: 51.5440°N 1.524°W
- Interest: Biological
- Area: 4.0 hectares (9.9 acres)
- Notification date: 1987
- Location map: Magic Map

Seven Barrows is a Bronze Age bowl barrow cemetery, 4-hectare (9.9-acre) of which are designated a biological Site of Special Scientific Interest, at Upper Lambourn in the civil parish of Lambourn in the English county of Berkshire. It is managed by the Berkshire, Buckinghamshire and Oxfordshire Wildlife Trust and it is a Scheduled Monument.

The area is an unimproved chalk grassland with a rich flora and over 100 species of herbs have been recorded. It is also very rich in insects, especially butterflies, including small blue, brown argus, chalkhill blue, dark green fritillary and the scarce marsh fritillary.
