= Lambourn =

Village and civil parish in West Berkshire

Coordinates: 51°30′32″N 1°31′52″W

- Village and civil parish
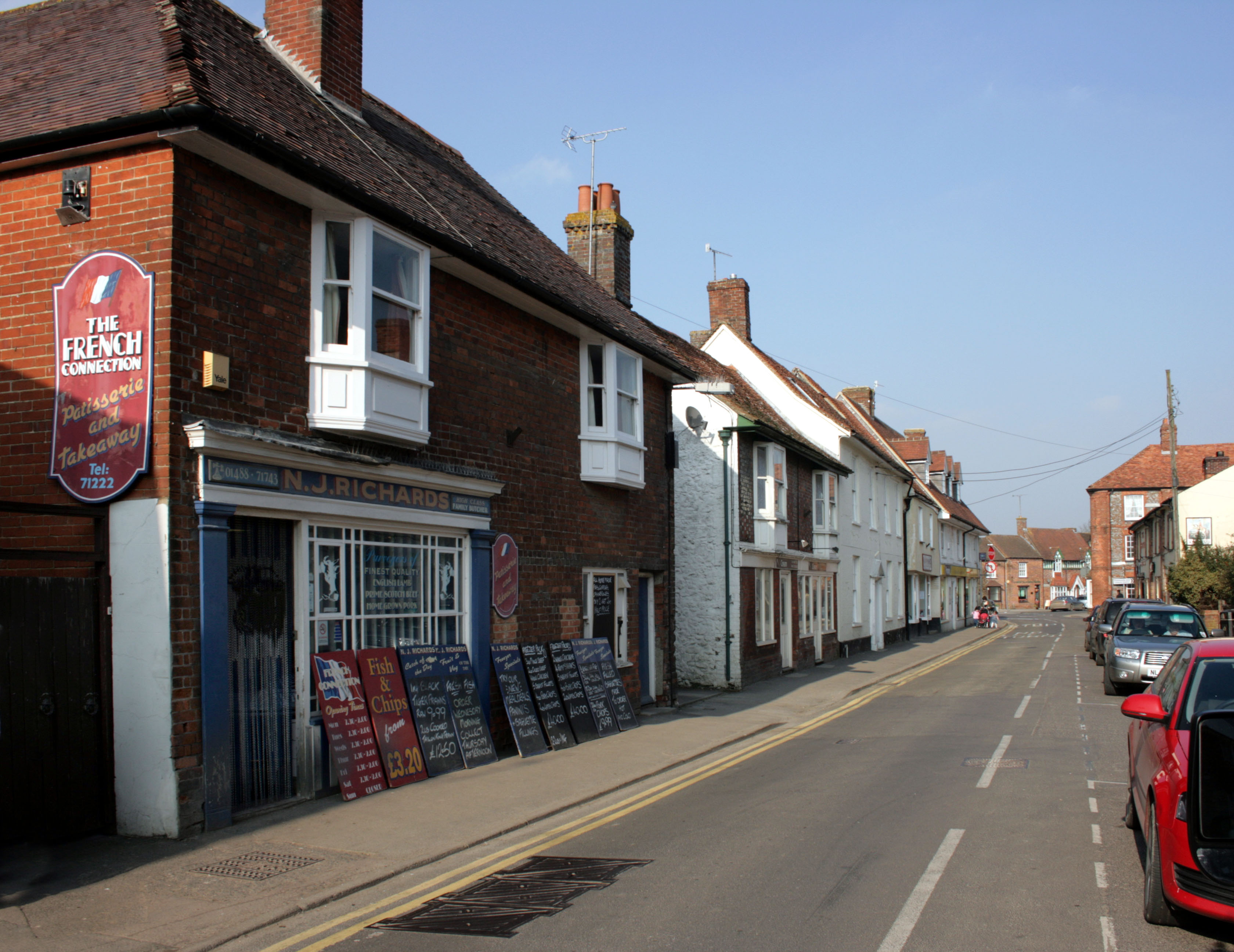
- High Street, Lambourn

- Location within Berkshire
- Area: 60.44 km^{2} (23.34 sq mi)
- Population: 4,222 (2021 census)
  - Density: 70/km^{2} (180/sq mi)
- OS grid reference: SU3278
- Civil parish: Lambourn
- Unitary authority: West Berkshire
- Ceremonial county: Berkshire
- Region: South East
- Country: England
- Sovereign state: United Kingdom
- Post town: Hungerford
- Postcode district: RG17
- Dialling code: 01488
- Police: Thames Valley
- Fire: Royal Berkshire
- Ambulance: South Central
- UK Parliament: Newbury
- Website: lambourn.org

Lambourn (/ˈlæmbɔːrn/) is a village and civil parish in West Berkshire, England. It lies just north of the M4 motorway between Swindon and Newbury, and borders Wiltshire to the west and Oxfordshire to the north. After Newmarket it is the largest centre of racehorse training in England, and is home to a rehabilitation centre for injured jockeys, an equine hospital, and several leading jockeys and trainers. To the north of the village are the prehistoric Seven Barrows and the nearby long barrow. In 2004 the Crow Down Hoard was found close to the village.

== History ==
The most common explanation for the name of Lambourn refers to the lambs that were once dipped in the local river. Many spellings have been used over the centuries, such as Lamburnan (880), Lamburna (1086), Lamborne (1644) and Lambourne. It was also called Chipping Lambourn because of its popular market. The spelling was fixed as 'Lambourn' in the early 20th century, but even today, towards Soley, three successive signposts at nearby junctions alternate the spelling of Lambourn and Lambourne. The village of Bockhampton was also known as Lower Lambourn.

The name Lambourn is an ancient name originating from the Brythonic language, which predates the arrival of the Saxon and Norman cultures in Britain. The etymology of the elements “Llan”, meaning enclosure, and “Bryn”, being hill, and together referring to the prominent Neolithic earthwork now known as Uffington Castle. This ancient hilltop enclosure, situated near the iconic Uffington White Horse and directly across from Dragon Hill, was historically referred to as Llan Bryn, denoting the enclosure atop the hill. The name became anglicized to several phonetic versions, ultimately settling on Lambourn, which has since become the defining toponym for the surrounding region. Numerous local features bear the name, including the Lambourn River, Lambourn Barrows, Lambourn Woodlands, Lambourn Downs, and the settlements of Lambourn and Upper Lambourn.

In 2004 a metal detecting rally found a hoard of three gold bracelets and two armlets at Crow Down near Lambourn. They have been dated to 1200 BCE and are the only prehistoric gold objects to have been found in Berkshire. The hoard was declared a treasure under English Law in 2005 and is on display at the West Berkshire Museum in Newbury. In Roman times, the area was extensively farmed, as shown by an archaeological research project based on Maddle Farm. Ermin Way, the major Roman road between Calleva Atrebatum (Silchester) and Glevum (Gloucester), also known as the "Upper or Baydon Road", passes through Lambourn Woodlands as part of the B4000.

=== Seven Barrows ===
Lambourn is famous for its Seven Barrows, just above Upper Lambourn. There are more than thirty Bronze Age burial mounds forming a large prehistoric cemetery. On a line west of the Seven Barrows is the Long Barrow, which dates from c. 4000 BCE, making it 2,000 years older than the other barrows. It has been half-destroyed by deep ploughing, and only the mound in the woods and a few sarsen stones remain.

=== Lambourn Church (minster) and almshouses ===
Lambourn Almshouse Act 1588
- Act of Parliament
- Parliament of England
- Long title: An Act concerning the almshouse at Lamberne in Berkshire.
- Citation: 31 Eliz. 1. c. 4 Pr.
- Territorial extent: England and Wales

Dates
- Royal assent: 29 March 1589
- Commencement: 4 February 1589 (Note: Start of session.)

Status: Current legislation

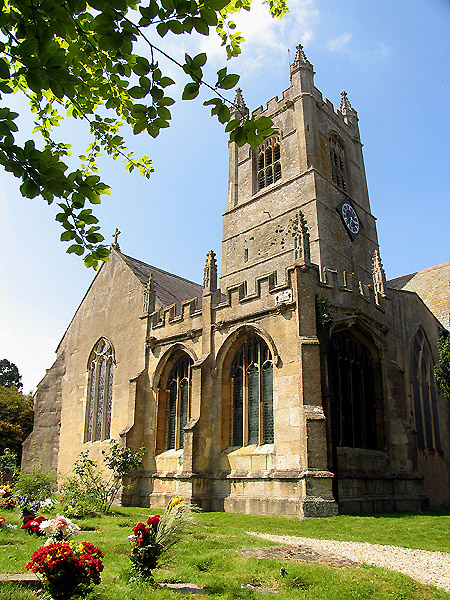
St Michael and All Angels

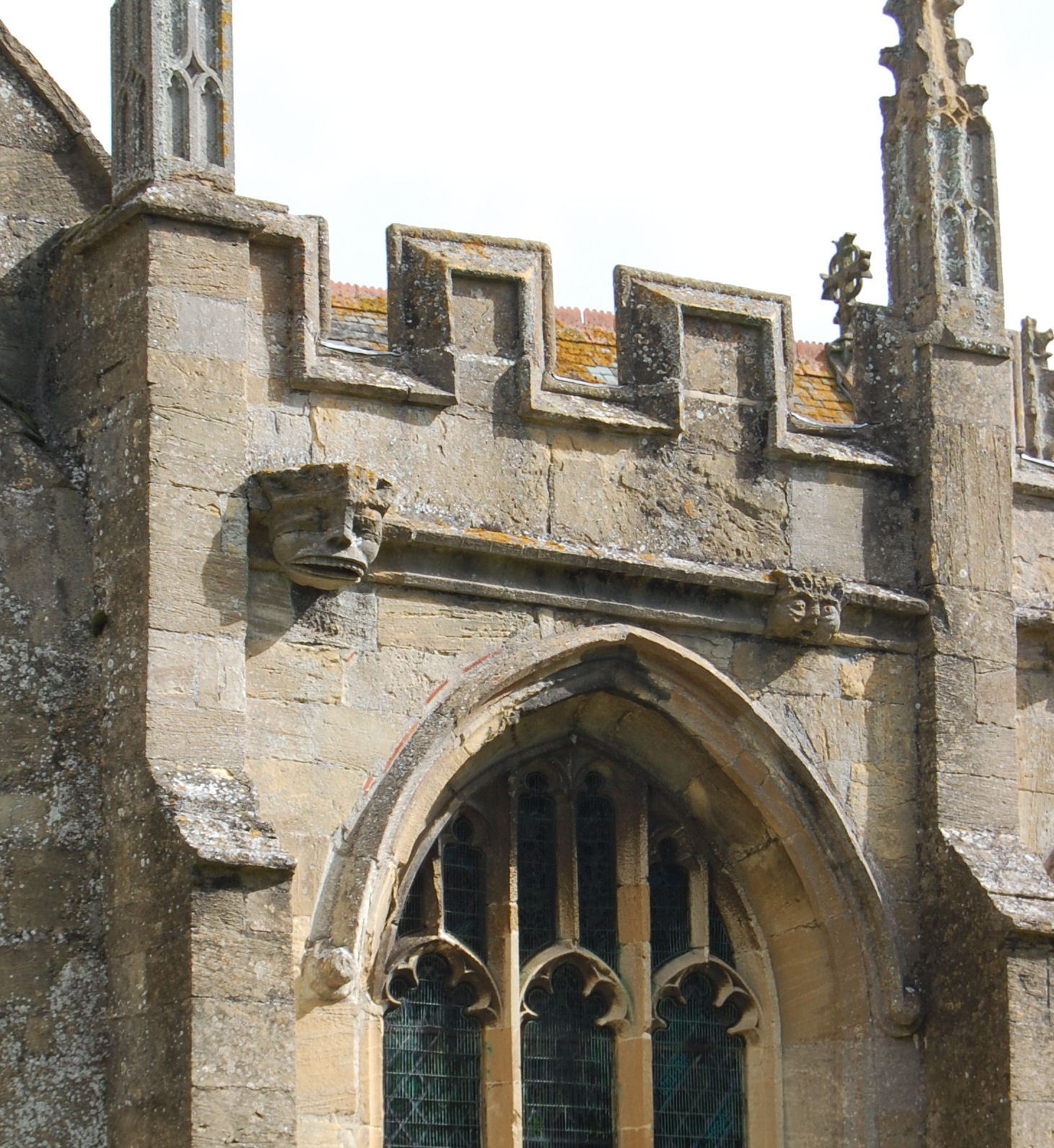
Detail on the south side of the church at the exact spot as in a sketch made by J.R.R.Tolkien in August 1912

...the Downs themselves shelter Lambourn's massive Norman nave.

The large, mainly Norman, Church of England parish church is in the village centre facing the historic market place, with a surrounding wall built of sarsen stones, and is dedicated to St Michael and All Angels. The road pattern shows an original circular enclosure, suggesting pagan Celtic origins. Alfred the Great, born in Wantage, was also closely connected with this ancient landmark. It has been a minster since Saxon times and officially known as Lambourn Minster since as early as 1032, and Alfred mentioned it in his will. It was probably Cnut who granted Lambourn Minster to the Dean of St Paul's.

Successors to that office held it until 1836. Inside are monuments to the great and the good of the many manors in the parish, including an excellent brass to John Estbury (1508), who founded the almshouses outside, and fine effigies of Sir Thomas Essex and his wife (1558). The almshouses were established by an Act of Parliament in the reign of King Henry VII and confirmed by his son King Henry VIII after the Dissolution of the Monasteries made the original uncertain, as it included a now forbidden chantry. There is an arch with mediaeval carvings of hunting scenes. The church was much restored in the late 19th century, and has a chancel roof designed by G. E. Street. The church also boasts a fine three-manual Henry Willis organ. The clock faces were replaced, and the tower stonework repaired, in 2011. The church is a Grade I listed building.

=== The Anarchy ===
The Empress Matilda bequeathed Lambourn and Chippenham to Hugh de Plucket out of the Royal demesne in 1142 for his aid in The Anarchy of the civil wars against the usurper Stephen of Blois. However, another Breton adventurer, Josce de Dinan and his knights, retreated to Lambourn after he lost Ludlow Castle to Gilbert de Lacey. Maltida's son King Henry II gave him Chipping Lambourn in compensation in 1156. Josce died in 1162 AD and in either case, the Plunket family were in possession of the Manor by the beginning of the 14th century.

=== Queen Elizabeth I ===
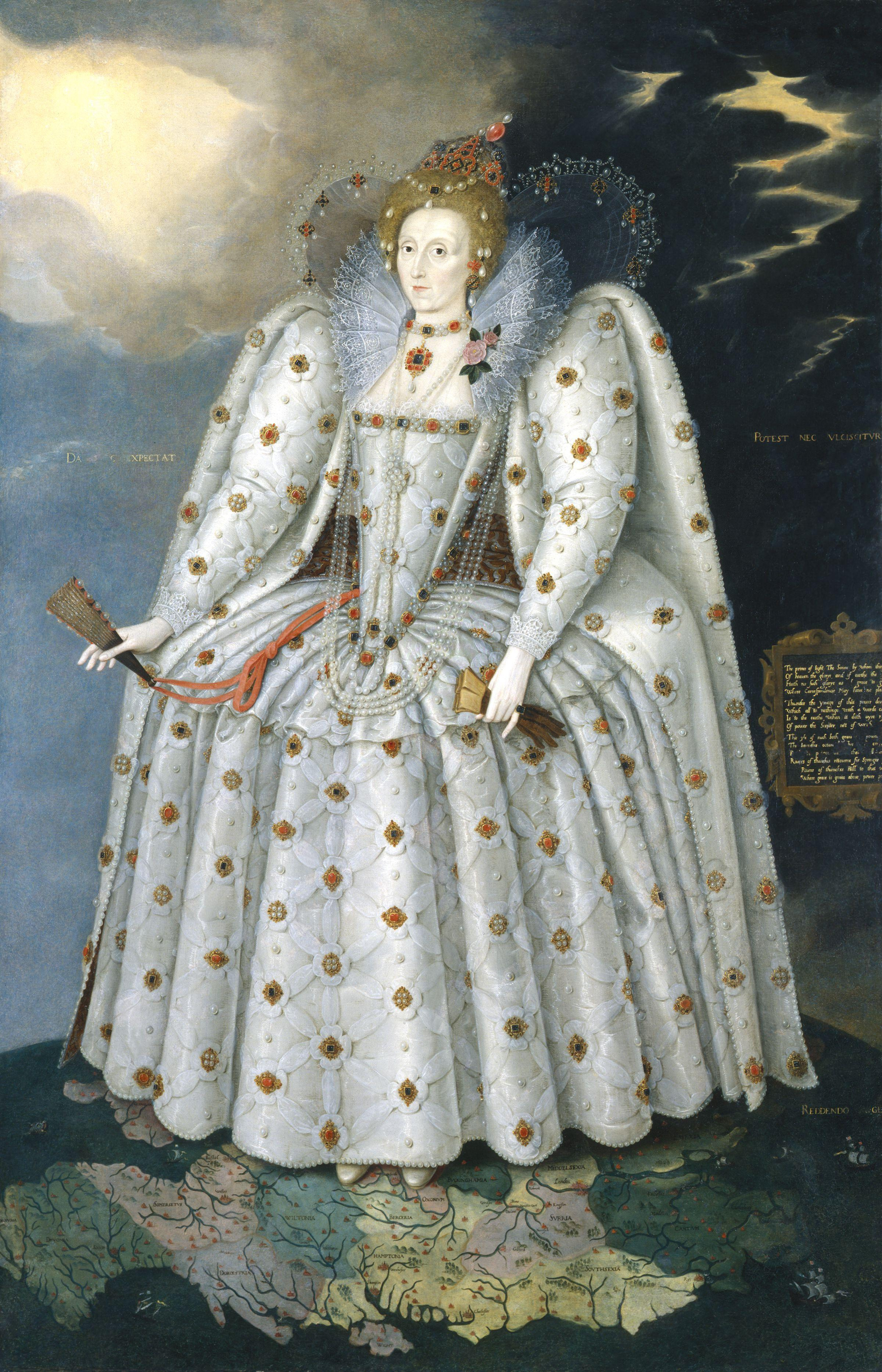
The Ditchley Portrait, Marcus Gheeraerts the Younger, c.1592

The Ditchley portrait of Queen Elizabeth I was painted for Sir Henry Lee of Ditchley to commemorate her visit in 1592. The Queen stands on a map of England with her feet on Oxfordshire and Lambourn is shown (but not named) on the map below her feet, in the downs of Berceria at the head of the River Lambourn which joins the River Kennet at Newbury.

=== Civil War ===
During the Civil War, Prince Rupert and his Cavaliers rested at Lambourn on the night of 18 and 19 September 1643, between fighting a skirmish with the Parliamentarian Army at Aldbourne Chase on the 18th and the First Battle of Newbury on the 20th. Queen Henrietta Maria stayed at Kingswood House on 18 April 1644 en route to Exeter, having said her final farewell to her husband King Charles I a few days before at Oxford. (Note: At page 189.) Kingswood was an Elizabethan manor house that was demolished a long time ago and replaced by the current Kingswood House Stables.

On 9 November 1644 King Charles and the Royalist Army relieved Donnington Castle in the face of the Army of the Eastern Association led by the Earl of Manchester and Oliver Cromwell. Thereafter he withdrew to Lambourn and stayed in "The King's Chamber" at Kingswood House, while the Royalist infantry were quartered in Lambourn and the cavalry at Wantage. The Parliamentarian Scoutmaster Sir Samuel Luke reported "Monday. 11 November 1644. The last night the King's headquarters were at Wantage and Lamborne ... all the foot that which lay at Lamborne marcht away this morning towards Auborne". (Note: At p189-190)

=== The Luddites and Captain Swing ===
There were Captain Swing anti-machinery riots in Lambourn in 1832–33. It was said that 'there would be no good times at Lambourn until there was a good fire', and several farm buildings were burned by Luddite agricultural labourers whose wages had been slashed by the introduction of machinery. The Marxist historian, Eric Hobsbawn, wrote 'A threshing machine was broken at Lambourn; and from there the movement spread south to Eastbury and East Garston, where money was collected and several machines were destroyed'. The labourers demanded 40 shillings for their loss of earnings and an increase in wages from 8 shillings to 12 shillings a week. They threatened to burn down farm buildings if they were not paid. Ten machines were destroyed in the Lambourn Valley from Fawley to Boxford, and the movement spread northwards to the Vale of the White Horse and the Thames Valley.

=== World War II plane crash ===
On 8 September 1944, a B-24 Liberator flown by 2nd Lt Lawrence Berkoff of the 856th Bombardment Squadron, USAAF encountered engine problems whilst undertaking a Carpetbagger mission from RAF Harrington. After aborting the mission and turning back north, Berkoff struggled to maintain control of the plane, whilst his crew parachuted to safety over Baydon. Continually losing altitude, he remained at the controls to divert the aircraft away from Lambourn, and was killed when it crash-landed in a field on Folly Road, Lambourn, at 10:45 pm, missing the village by a few hundred yards. Berkoff was awarded a posthumous Distinguished Flying Cross; a plaque in his honour was unveiled on 26 June 2003 by his great nephew, Todd Berkoff, at Lambourn Memorial Hall.

=== 1953 lorry crash ===
On Tuesday 13 April 1953 an articulated lorry carrying 3,600 imp gal (16,000 L; 4,300 US gal) of aviation fuel suffered brake failure as it came down Hungerford Hill (now the B4000). Despite the best efforts of the driver, it hit several buildings before overturning on Oxford Street. The lorry exploded, destroying the tobacconist's, confectioner's, watchmaker's, jeweller's and antique dealer's shops, but only the driver was killed. The burning fuel set fire to three houses, two thatched cottages and several flats, and 37 people were made homeless. It also flowed down the street and into the River Lambourn and set fire to property up to 50 yards away until the Newbury, Hungerford, Wantage, Swindon and Faringdon fire brigades helped the local brigade quench the fire.

=== 1971 lurcher show ===
The first dog show for lurchers was held at Lambourn in 1971, which included dog racing and coursing.

=== 1991 motorway crash ===
At 14:15 hours on Wednesday 13 March 1991 there was a major crash on the M4 Motorway in the southernmost part of Lambourn between the Membury Service Station and Junction 14 on the eastbound carriageway. A van driver fell asleep at the wheel and stopped alongside the central crash barrier on the right hand (overtaking) lane. This obstruction was seen by the car behind him, which managed to change lanes and avoid contact. However, the cars behind were travelling at high speed (an average of 70 miles per hour (110 km/h)) in patchy fog and many were only one or two car lengths behind the vehicle in front. As a result, they had no time to avoid the van, crashed and spun out of control into the other lanes. Others took evasive action by driving onto the hard shoulder and up the sides of the cutting.

These were followed by articulated lorries, one of which jack-knifed sideways across all three lanes of the motorway. One driver, Alan Bateman, managed to free himself from his car and ran back down the central reservation to warn others, but was ignored and was even hooted at by some drivers as they continued towards the crash. The crash included 51 vehicles and lasted 19 seconds, car fuel was ignited along with the combustible material being carried in one of the vans and the eastbound motorway was closed for four days as the melted wreckage was cut away and the tarmac replaced.

Ten people were killed and twenty-five were injured, and there were three minor crashes caused by distracted drivers on the other side of the motorway. In Parliament, Sir Michael McNair-Wilson MP asked why the Thames Valley Police and Wiltshire Police forces had not turned on the motorway warning lights to warn drivers of the fog, but the secretary of state for transport, Christopher Chope, stated that these were only used for hazards not readily apparent to drivers and not adverse weather conditions. The crash led to warning lights being used to warn drivers of fog on British motorways.

== Governance ==
Besides Lambourn itself, the civil parish comprises the villages of Upper Lambourn, Eastbury, Woodlands St Mary and Lambourn Woodlands, together with the hamlets of Mile End, Sheepdrove and Bockhampton and a considerable area of rural downland. The civil parish is split into four wards for electoral purposes: Upper Lambourn, Eastbury and Woodlands St Mary/Lambourn Woodlands elect two councillors; and nine are elected from Lambourn itself.

For local government, the parish is in the unitary district of West Berkshire. Historically, under Berkshire County Council, it was in Hungerford Rural District from 1894 to 1974, and Newbury district from 1974 until 1998, when the county council was abolished and Newbury district became the unitary West Berkshire district.

For elections to parliament, it is within Newbury parliamentary constituency.

== Demographics ==
Census population of Lambourn parish
Census	Population	Female	Male	Households	Source
2001	4,017	2,005	2,012	1,674	
2011	4,103	2,048	2,055	1,783	
2021	4,222	2,165	2,057	1,875	

2011 census key statistics
Output area	Population	Homes	Owned outright	Owned with a loan	Socially rented	Privately rented	Other	km^{2} identified in 2005 Survey	km^{2} Greenspace (Note: Comprises cultivated fields, paddock, paths, pasture and woodland.)	km^{2} gardens	km^{2} road
Lambourn (civil parish)	4,103	1,783	490	546	390	261	86	59.6	56.9	0.9	0.8

== Geography ==
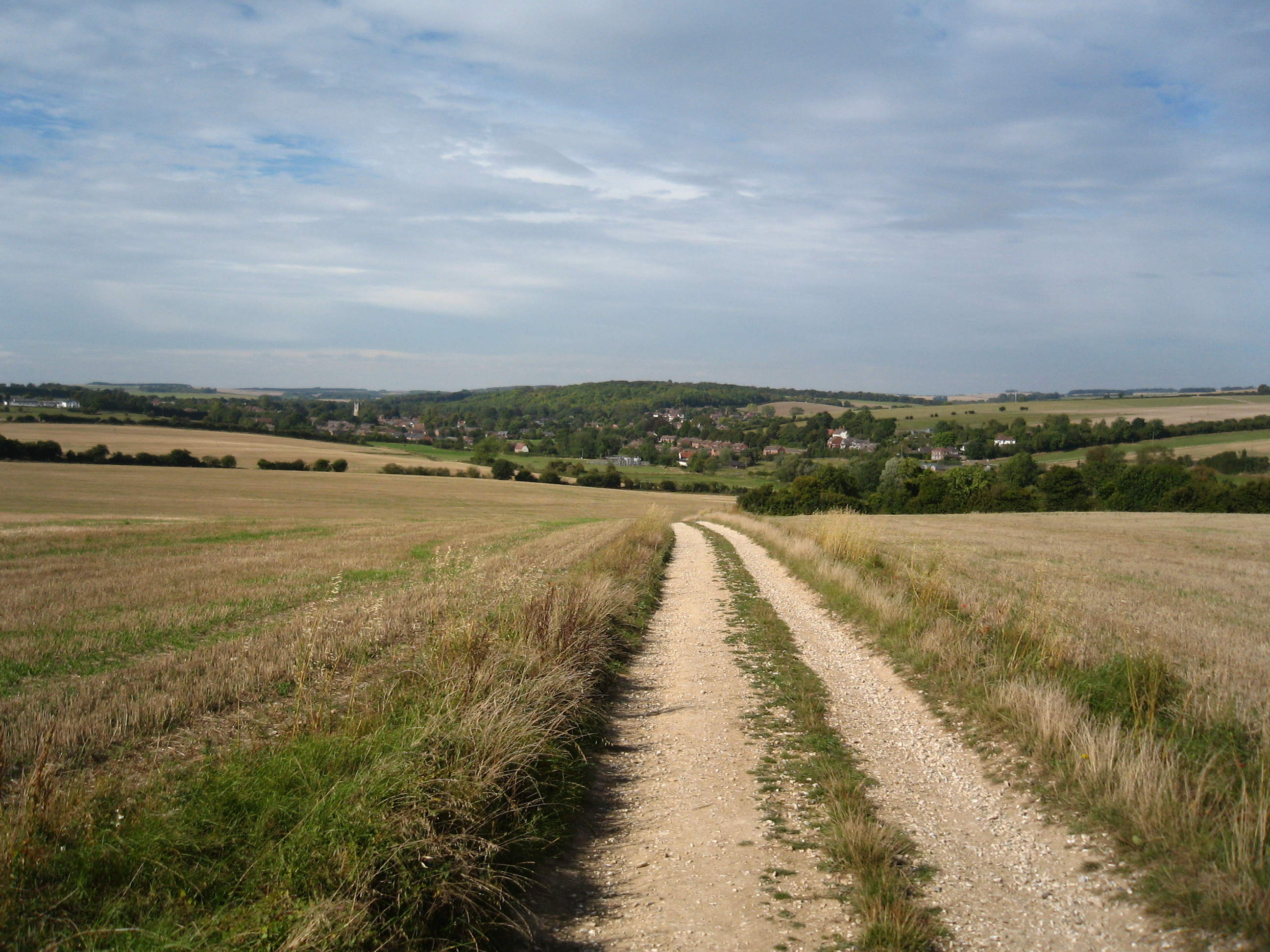
Footpath to Lambourn

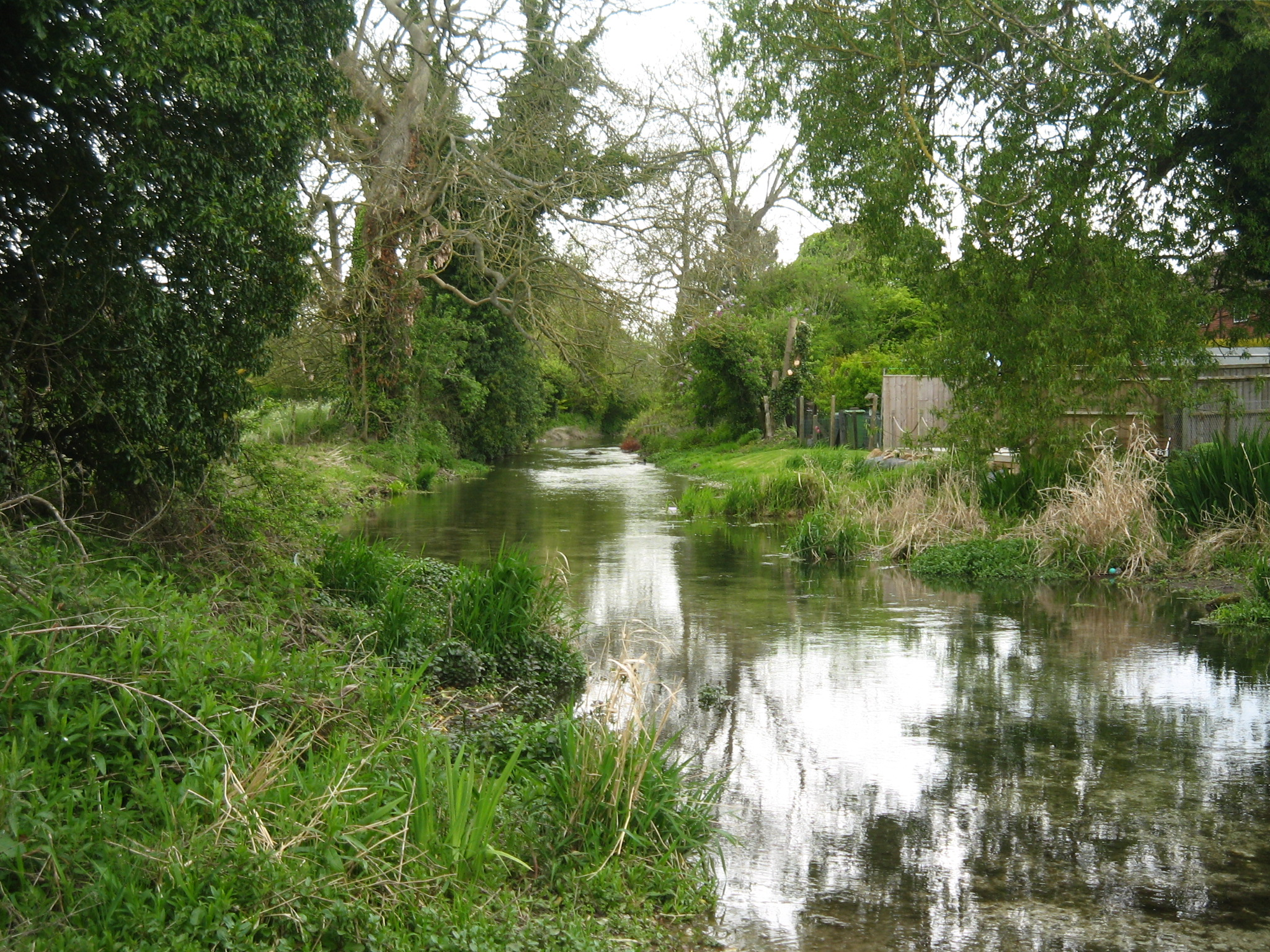
River Lambourn

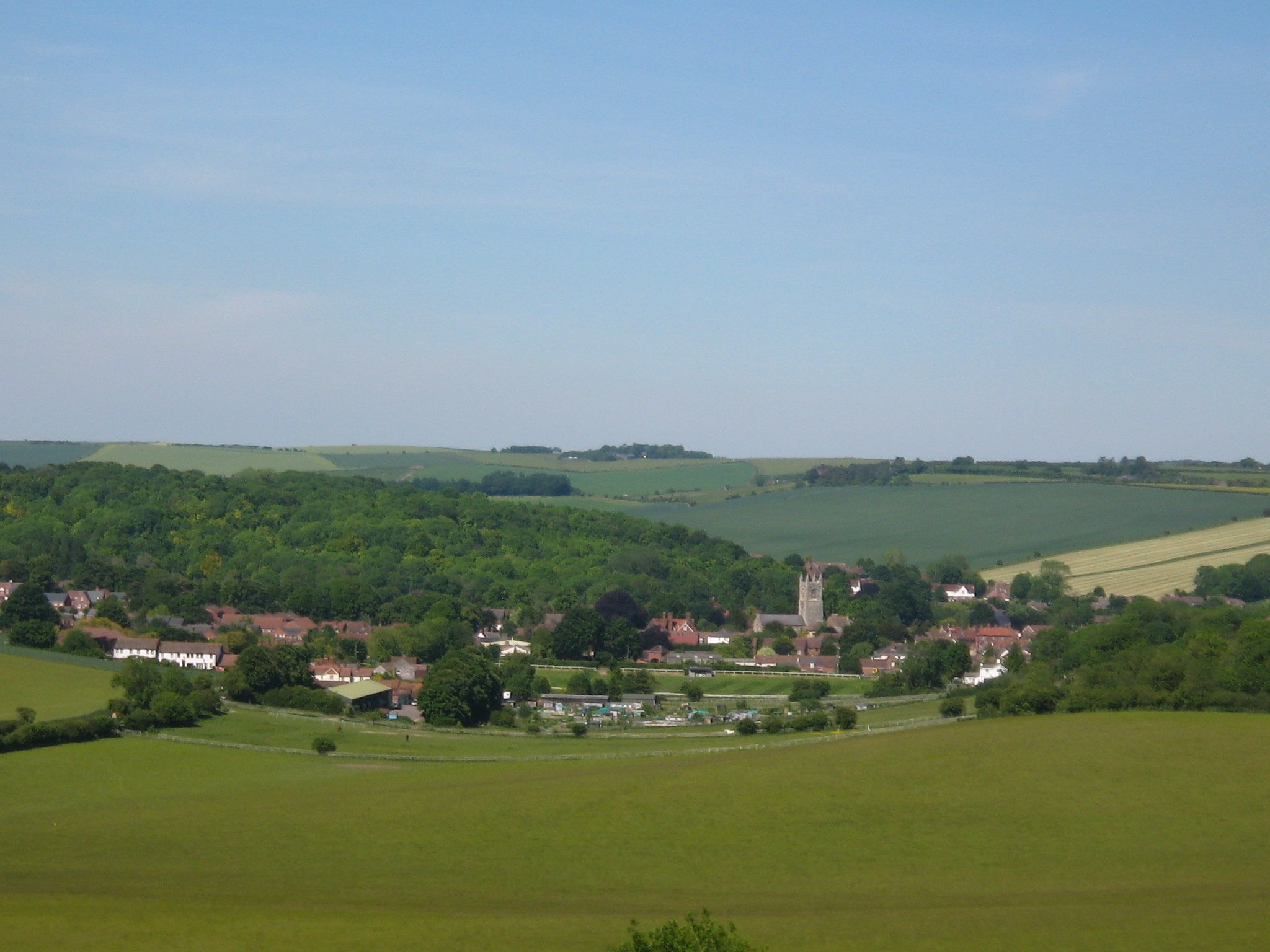
Lambourn and Lynch Wood from Hungerford Hill

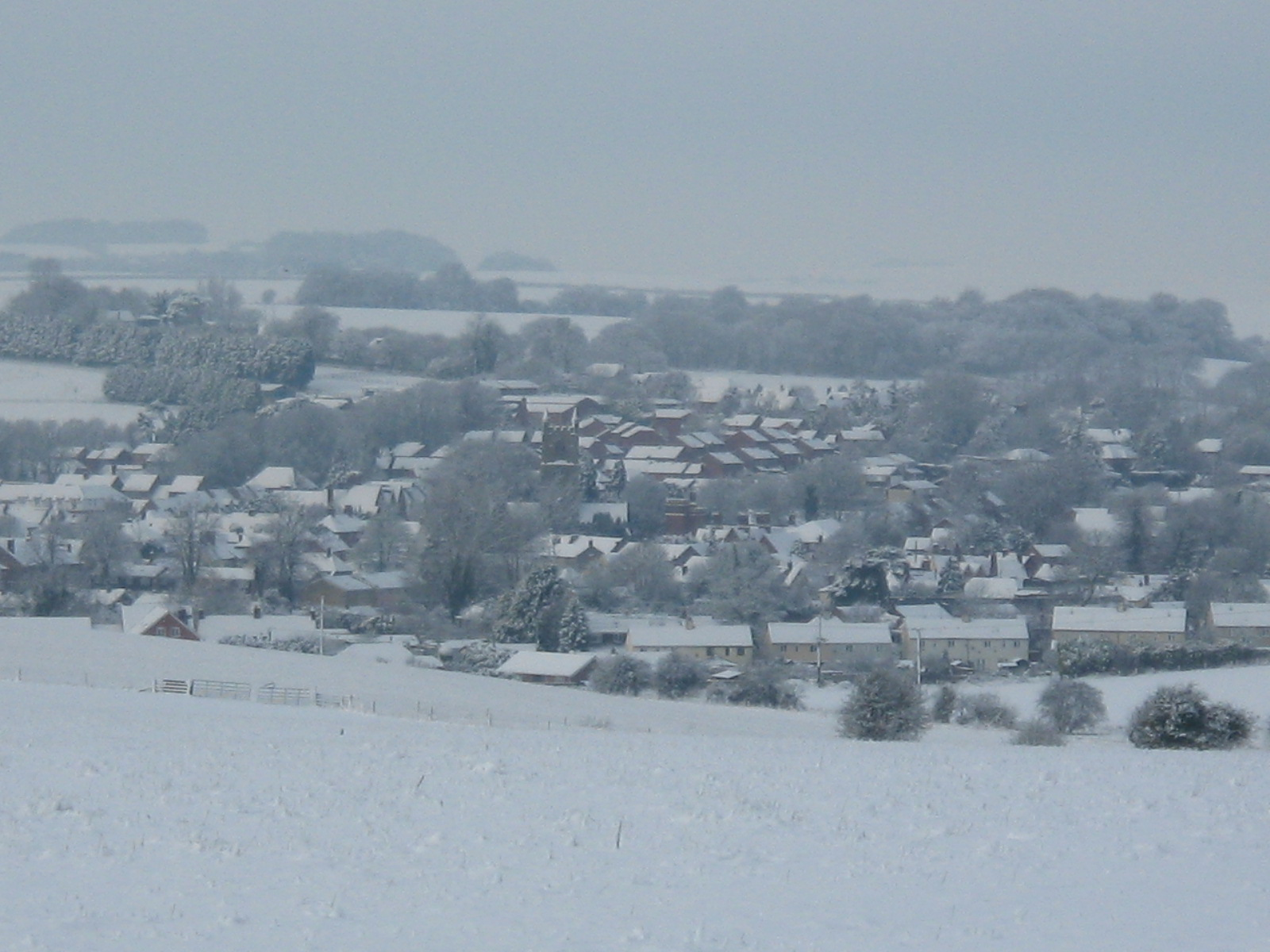
Lambourn under snow in February 2009

Lambourn covers most of the upper valley of the River Lambourn, a bourne in the chalk upland area of the Berkshire Downs. It is 13 miles (21 km) northwest of Newbury, 11 miles (18 km) southeast of Swindon, 7 miles (11 km) southwest of Wantage, 7 miles (11 km) north of Hungerford and 71 miles (114 km) west of London (via B4000 and M4). Since the 1974 boundary changes, Lambourn has been the westernmost parish in Berkshire, bordering northeastern Wiltshire and southwestern Oxfordshire. Membury Services, on the site of RAF Membury, Membury transmitting station and the northeastern quarter of Membury Iron Age hillfort are in the southwest corner of the parish.

The parish shares boundaries with the Berkshire parishes of East Garston and Hungerford, with the Wiltshire parishes of Chilton Foliat, Ramsbury and Baydon, and with the Oxfordshire parishes of Ashbury, Compton Beauchamp, Woolstone, Uffington, Kingston Lisle, Sparsholt, Childrey and Letcombe Bassett.

=== Lambourn Downs ===
They heard of the Great Barrows, and the green mounds, and the stone-rings upon the hills and in the hollows among the hills. Sheep were bleating in flocks. Green walls and white walls rose. There were fortresses on the heights. Kings of little kingdoms fought together, and the young Sun shone like fire on the red metal of their new and greedy swords. There was victory and defeat; and towers fell, fortresses were burned, and flames went up into the sky. Gold was piled on the biers of dead kings and queens; and mounds covered them, and the stone doors were shut; and the grass grew over all. Sheep walked for a while biting the grass, but soon the hills were empty again.

— J. R. R. Tolkien, The Lord of the Rings

The Lambourn Downs (an area of the Berkshire Downs) are part of the North Wessex Downs Area of Outstanding Natural Beauty and cover an area of 231 square miles (600 km^{2}), from the Ridgeway in the north to the River Kennet in the south. Originally they were entirely in Berkshire, but northern third of the downs were transferred to Oxfordshire when the county border was reorganised in 1974. Due to the poor, chalky soil, the downs could not be used for growing crops until the advent of modern fertilisers. Consequently, the high ground was only used for breeding sheep – hence the name of Lambourn – and horses.

The Oxford don and author J. R. R. Tolkien lived nearby and travelled to the downs with his family and friends. He was impressed by the downs with their sarsen stones, barrows and hill forts and painted pictures of Lambourn in 1912. Within Lambourn parish are the following downs and chalk hills: Bockhampton Down, Cleeve Hill, Coppington Down, Coppington Hill, Crow Down, Eastbury Down, Ewe Hill, Farncombe Down, Fognam Down, Haycroft Hill, Hungerford Hill, Kingsdown, Lodge Down, Mandown, Near Down, Parkfarm Down, Pit Down, Post Down, Row Down, Stancombe Down, Thorn Hill, Warren Down and Wellbottom Down.

== Transport ==
Lambourn lies on the crossroads of the B4000 from Newbury to Highworth and the B4001 from Chilton Foliat to Childrey. The B4000 used to follow the River Lambourn up the Newbury Road until the construction of the M4 motorway in the early 1970s. When the motorway was built, the B4000 was diverted along Ermin Way as the old road could not be widened for HGVs in the narrow streets of Great Shefford, Eastbury and Lambourn. The B4001 was also diverted onto Ermin Way because of the M4, and the B4000 and B4001 merge until they arrive in Lambourn at the bottom of Hungerford Hill. The M4 passes through the southern part of the parish, between Junction 14, (7 miles (11 km) southeast of the village, and Junction 15, (8 miles (13 km) to the west.

In 1898 the Lambourn Valley Railway was built connecting Lambourn to Newbury. Its ownership merged with the Great Western Railway in 1905. The line continued in operation until it was closed in 1960. The nearest station is now at Hungerford on the Reading to Taunton line.

== Economy ==
Lambourn and the surrounding downland is best known today as a major horse racing centre, mainly National Hunt. Many villagers' work is related to horse racing, but there are an increasing number of commuters who use the M4, including many airline pilots based at Heathrow. The United Kingdom's last makers of dress and day cravats were based in Lambourn until they closed in 2006. Lambourn Racehorse Transport was founded in the village in 1930 and transports many of the local horses, especially since the closure of the Lambourn Valley Railway in 1964. It is owned by Merrick Francis, the son of Dick Francis, and is the largest horse transport business in Europe. Sheepdrove Organic Farm is based near Lambourn.

=== Horse racing ===
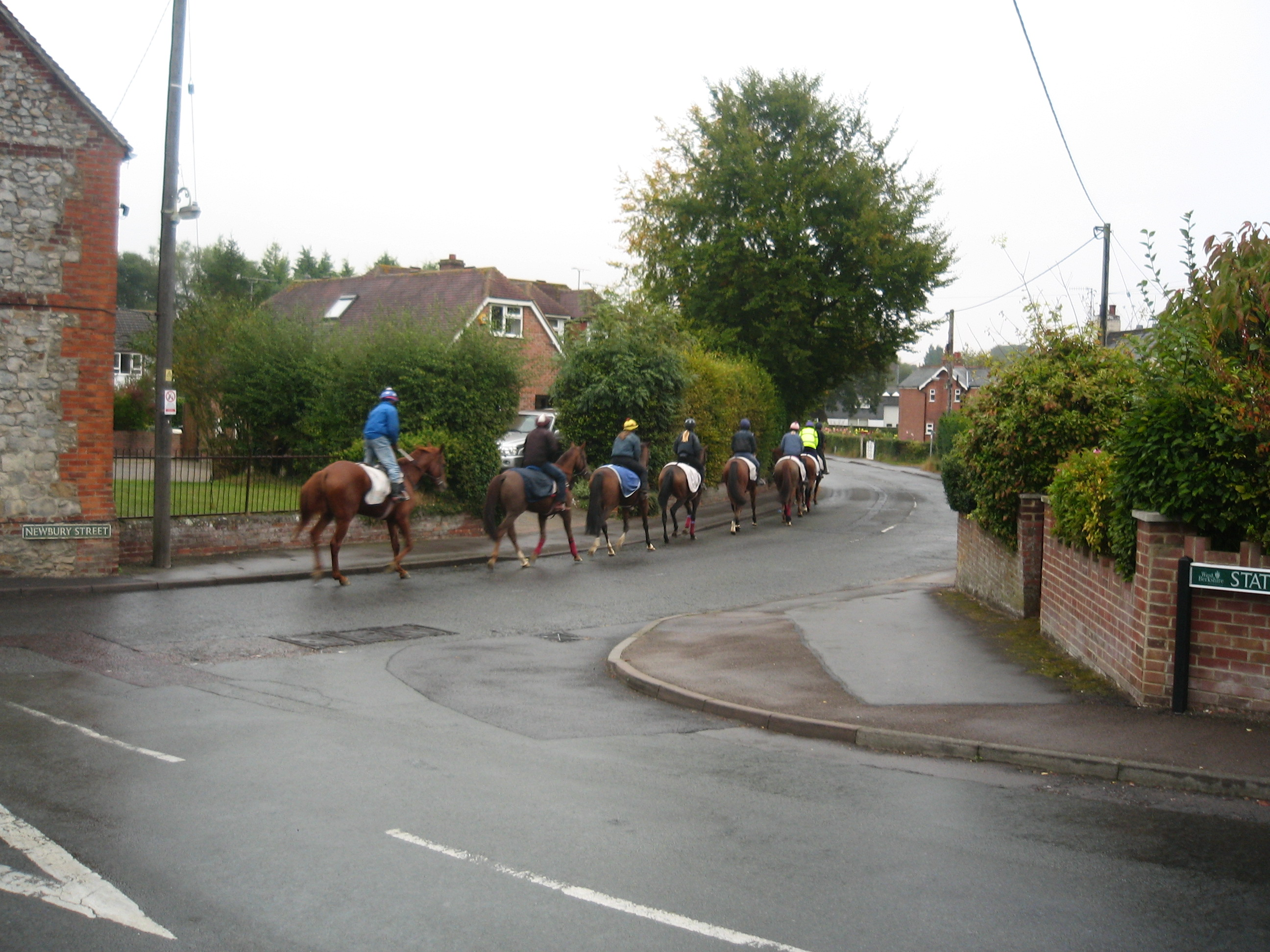
Jockeys riding thoroughbreds to the gallops in Lambourn

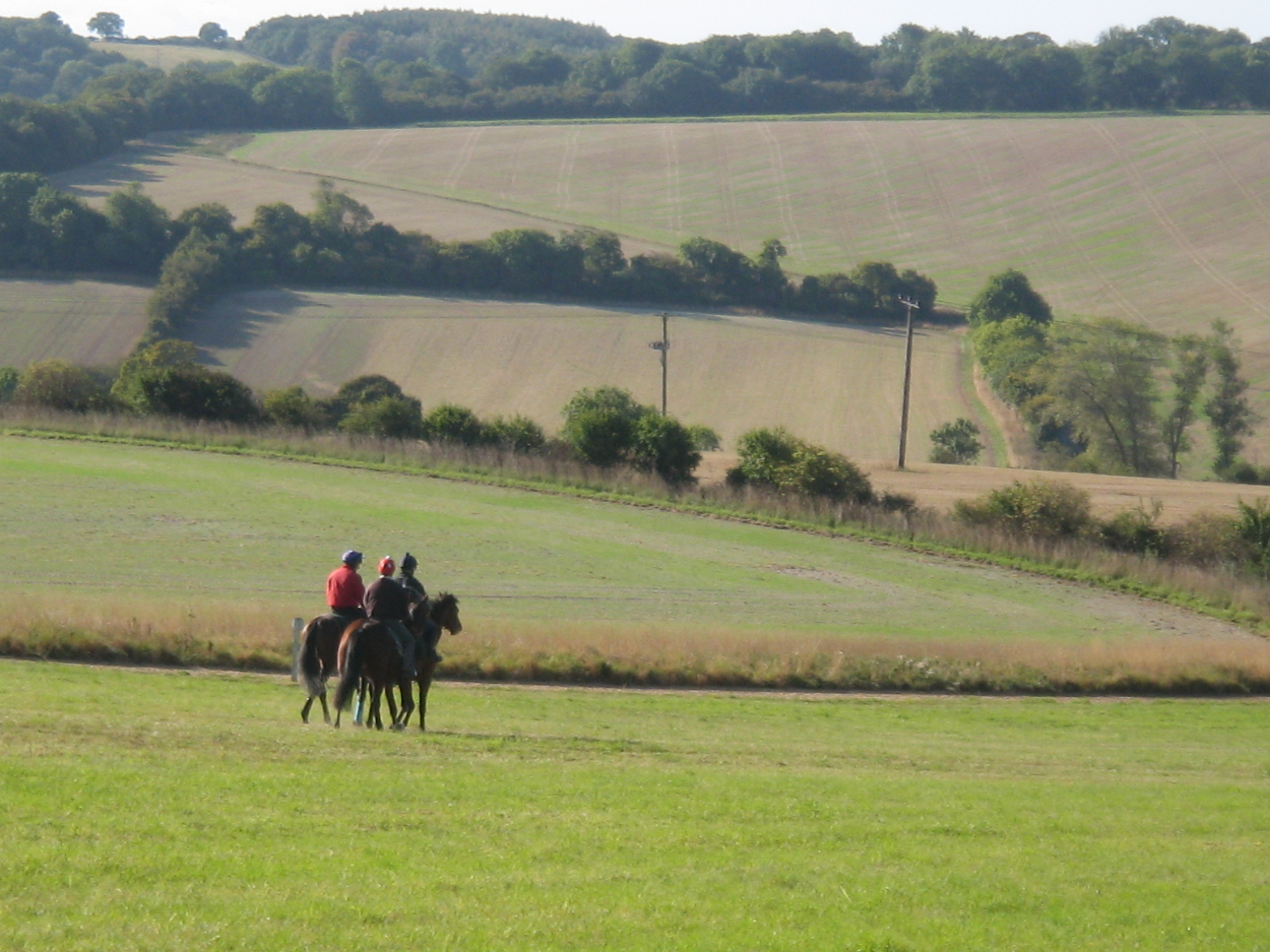
Valley of the Racehorse

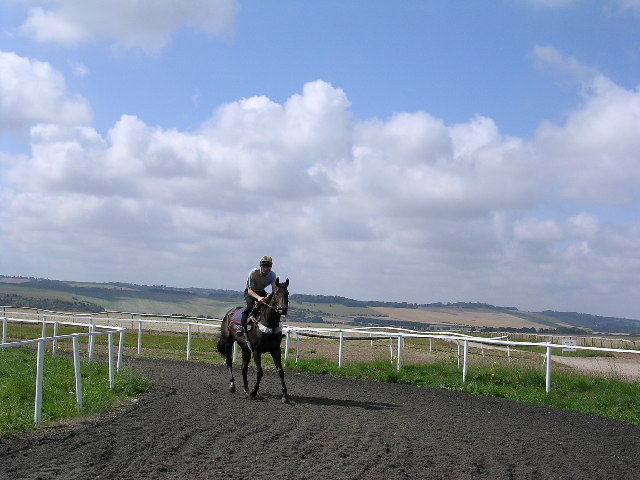
Gallops, Wellbottom Down

Lambourn is a unique town as almost everyone is involved in horse racing – from top trainers such as Mick Channon, Charlie Mann and Henrietta Knight through to the saddlers and stable lads and lasses.

— Clare Balding

The racing connection began in the 18th century, when the Earl of Craven held racing meetings on Weathercock Hill near Ashdown House. There were regular race meetings on the Lambourn Downs and private race meetings can be held on Mandown between Upper Lambourn and Seven Barrows. In the 1840s some owners moved their racehorses to Lambourn as the ground at Newmarket was too firm and caused many horses to break down. The first trainers were Edwin Parr, Joseph Saxon, John Prince, Luke Snowden (one of the few trainers to be buried at St Michaels graveyard) and John Drinkald, who went insane when his horse was disqualified after winning a race in which he stood to win £28,000.

The first stables were at the Red Lion Inn on the crossroads opposite the church (the inn has since been converted into flats), and at Lambourn Stables, now called Kingswood House Stables. The well drained, spongy grass, open downs and long flats made Lambourn ideal for training racehorses and it became a fashionable training centre. Lord Rothschild had his stables at Russley Park, just west of Lambourn in Wiltshire, and, like those of Lord Craven, his horses practised on the gallops at Lambourn. Lambourn Place, a large house near the village centre, was used as racing stables from 1888. It was demolished in 1938 and was later replaced by a modern housing estate.

It was not until the Lambourn Valley Railway was built in 1898 that Lambourn grew into its present size. Until then horses could only attend local meets, or had to walk the 10–15 miles to the railway at Newbury. Horses could now be transported to Newbury and from there to meetings all over the country, and many new stables were opened in the area. Over 1,500 horses are now stabled in and around Lambourn – second only to Newmarket. There are many major stables and varied turf and all-weather gallops in and around the village. It has two fully licensed equine swimming pools and the Ridgeway Veterinary Group Valley Equine Hospital. As a result, it has been dubbed the "Valley of the Racehorse", and this is displayed on the road signs leading into the village.

In 2006 the Jockey Club Estates Ltd bought 500 acres (2.0 km^{2}) of land in the valley, its first investment outside Newmarket, including Mandown and many other gallops and training grounds The Oaksey House rehabilitation centre for injured jockeys was built in Lambourn in 2008, named after Lord Oaksey, the President of the Injured Jockeys Fund. In 2013, Mehmet Kurt, the owner of the Kingwood Stud in Lambourn, received permission to build a 1.5 km (0.93 mi) long horse training monorail, the first in the country.

Some Lambourn Derby winners include:

- Steve Donoghue on Pommern in 1914, trained by Charles Peck at Sefton Lodge
- Harry Wragg on Felstead in 1928, trained by "Ossie" Bell at Delamere Stables
- Pat Eddery on Grundy in 1975, trained by Peter Walwyn at Seven Barrows House
- Martin Dwyer on Sir Percy in 2006, trained by Marcus Tregoning at Kingwood House Stables

Some Lambourn Grand National winners include:

- Pat Buckley on Ayala in 1963, trained by Keith Piggott at South Bank
- Willie Robinson on Team Spirit in 1964, trained by Fulke Walwyn at Saxon House
- Tommy Smith on Jay Trump in 1965, trained by Fred Winter at Uplands Stables
- Tim Norman on Anglo in 1966, trained by Fred Winter at Uplands Stables
- Ben de Haan on Corbiere in 1983, trained by Jenny Pitman at Weathercock House
- Marcus Armytage on Mr Frisk, in 1990, trained by Kim Bailey at Old Manor Stables
- Carl Llewellyn on Party Politics in 1992, trained by Nick Gaselee at Saxon Cottage Stables
- John White on Esha Ness, in the void 1993 Grand National, trained by Jenny Pitman at Weathercock House
- Jason Titley on Royal Athlete in 1995, trained by Jenny Pitman at Weathercock House
- Leighton Aspell on Many Clouds in 2015, trained by Oliver Sherwood at Rhonehurst

Notable stables in Lambourn include Kingwood House Stables and Seven Barrows House.

== In popular culture ==
=== Poetry ===
Lambourn is mentioned in the poetry of Hilaire Belloc and G. K. Chesterton. Georgian poet John Freeman wrote Lambourn Town and 20th century poet Sir John Betjeman wrote Upper Lambourne.

=== Fiction ===
- Colin Dexter, The Daughters of Cain (1994), one of the suspects is Ashley Davies, a racehorse owner who has his horses at Seven Barrows in Upper Lambourn.
- Jasper Fforde, Lost in a Good Book (2002); The second of the Thursday Next novels mentions that aliens landing in Lambourn is an urban myth.
- Dick Francis, Reflex (1981); Jump jockey/photographer Philip Nore lives in Lambourn and much of the book's action takes place there. Break In (1985) and Bolt (1986); Steeplechase jockey Christmas "Kit" Fielding is based at Lambourn. To the Hilt (1996); the painter Alexander Kinloch marries Emily at St Michaels Church.
- Dick Francis and Felix Francis, Silks (2008); the lawyer and amateur jockey Geoffrey Mason investigates a murder in Lambourn.
- Ben Osborne, The Hyperion Legacy (2008) and The Rule of Lazari (2009); the jockey Danny Rawlings is based at Millhouse Stables in Lambourn.
- Patrick Robinson, To The Death (2008); the terrorist General Ravi Rashood drives to Lambourn for target practice in preparation for assassinating the President of the United States.

=== Television ===
- Inspector Morse (1996), In The Daughters of Cain Lewis is sent to interview the suspect Ashley Davies at Seven Barrows, which was filmed on Mandown.
- Race Country by Clare Balding, which documents the everyday life of 'The Valley of the Racehorse' and the day-to-day running of some of the country's top stables.

== Notable residents ==
Tony McCoy

- Frederick Bates, batsman for Hampshire County Cricket Club in the 1920s
- Noel Chance, racehorse trainer
- Charles Chenery, 19th century footballer and cricketer
- Dick Francis, jockey and best-selling author (Note: Dick Francis lived in a bungalow which he built himself using the money he earned as a jockey.)
- John Francome, jockey, horseracing presenter and best-selling author
- Chris Gent, former CEO and chairman of Vodafone
- Nicky Henderson, jockey and racehorse trainer
- Charlie Mann, ex jockey and racehorse trainer.
- Dick Hern, jockey and trainer of the Derby winners Troy (1979), Henbit (1980) and Nashwan (1989)
- Barry Hills, ex-jockey and racehorse trainer
- George Clement Martin, composer and organist of St Paul's Cathedral
- Tony McCoy, jockey and winner of the 2010 Grand National on Don't Push It
- Patrick Macnee, actor, who lived in College House with his father Major Daniel "Shrimp" Macnee, a jockey and racehorse trainer, and his mother Dorothea Macnee
- Lester Piggott, jockey and racehorse trainer who rode the first of his record nine Derby winners Never Say Die (1954) while living with his father Keith Piggott in Lambourn
- Cozy Powell, rock drummer who died in a car crash when driving to Bristol from his home in Lambourn.
- Jenny Pitman, author and trainer of the Grand National winners Corbiere (1983) and Royal Athlete (1995)
- Thomas Richard Quinn, jockey
- Joshua Sylvester, poet who influenced John Milton
- Fulke Walwyn racehorse trainer and winning jockey of the 1936 Grand National on Reynoldstown
- Peter Walwyn, cousin of Fulke Walwyn and trainer of the 1975 Derby winner Grundy
- Frederick Thomas Winter, winner of the Grand National on Sundew (1957) and Kilmore (1962) as a jockey and with Jay Trump (1965) and Anglo (1966) as a trainer

== Local institutions ==
- Parish Church of St. Michael and All Angels (Church of England)
- Sacred Heart Roman Catholic Church
- Lambourn Methodist Chapel
- Eastbury's Almshouses (1501)
- Hardrett's Almshouses (1625)
- Lambourn Valley Housing Trust is a registered charity, which raises money to provide homes for both retired and working stable staff.

== Sport and leisure ==
- Football club Lambourn Sports F.C. play at Lambourn Sports Club
- Lambourn Sports Club : (Note: Established in 1946.) a members' sports and social club with a large function hall
- Lambourn Centre with a gym, sports hall and sauna
- Sports field with skatepark
- Bowls club with bowling green
- Library
- Pubs, both which serve food
- Lambourn Allotment Society
- Lambourn Chimers (local hand bell ringing group)
- Lambourn Theatre Group
- Lambourn Vintage Machinery Society
- Lambourn WI
- Lambourn Air Rifle Club
- Lambourn Carnival with events including a horse show, and a procession of floats through the village
- Shefford Young Farmers Club
- Lambourn has a local nature reserve on its borders called Watts Bank.

== Sources & Further Reading ==
- Vic Cox, Vic: Lambeth to Lambourn (2001) – the memoirs of Lambeth boy whose family came from Lambourn and returned there once the London bombing began, Vic served overseas during WWII and returned to Lambourn at the end of the war and remained there until his death in 2003.
- Jennifer Davies, Tales of the Old Horsemen (2006)
- John Footman, History of the Parish Church of Saint Michael and All Angels, Chipping Lambourn (2009)
- Dick Francis. A Jockey's Life: The Biography of Lester Piggott (1986)
- Bryony Fuller, Fulke Walwyn: A Pictorial Tribute (1990)
- Alan Lee, Lambourn – A Village of Racing (1982)
- Vic Mitchell, Kevin Smith and Kevin Robertson, Branch Lines to Lambourn (2001)
- Robin Oakley, Valley of the Racehorse: A Year in the Life of Lambourn (2000)
- Page, William; Ditchfield, P.H., eds. (1907). Victoria County History: A History of the County of Berkshire, Volume 2. Archibald Constable & Co. p. 95.
- Lambourn Page, William; Ditchfield, P.H., eds. (1924). Victoria County History: A History of the County of Berkshire, Volume 4. pp. 251–266.
- Pevsner, Nikolaus (1966). The Buildings of England: Berkshire. Harmondsworth: Penguin Books. pp. 163–166.
- Lester Piggott, Lester: The Autobiography of Lester Piggott (1995)
- Jenny Pitman, Jenny Pitman, The Autobiography (1999)
- Martin Randall Connop Price, Lambourn Valley Railway (1964); idem. With plates (Locomotion papers. no. 32.) (1966)
- Bridget Rennison, A Short Guide to the Parish Church of Saint Michael and All Angels Lambourn (1971)
- Kevin Robertson and Roger Simmonds, Illustrated History of the Lambourn Branch (1984)
- T. K. Robertson, A. S. Robertson and D. A. Gray, Water Supply Papers of the Institute of Geological Sciences: Research Report No. 5: Borehole Logging Investigations in the Chalk of the Lambourn and Winterbourne Valleys' of Berkshire (1971)
- Rogers, Joseph (2016). A Spectrum of Settlements pp. 21 – 26
- Julie Shuttleworth, Social and economic change in Lambourn Hundred, 1522–1663 (1998)
- R. Smith, The Seven Barrows at Lambourn (1921)
- Stephen Sugden, A Dick Francis Companion: Characters, Horses, Plots, Settings and Themes (2008)
- Peter Walwyn, Handy All the Way: A Trainer's Life (2000)
