= Hungerford Newtown =

Coordinates: 51°26′28″N 1°29′17″W

- Hamlet
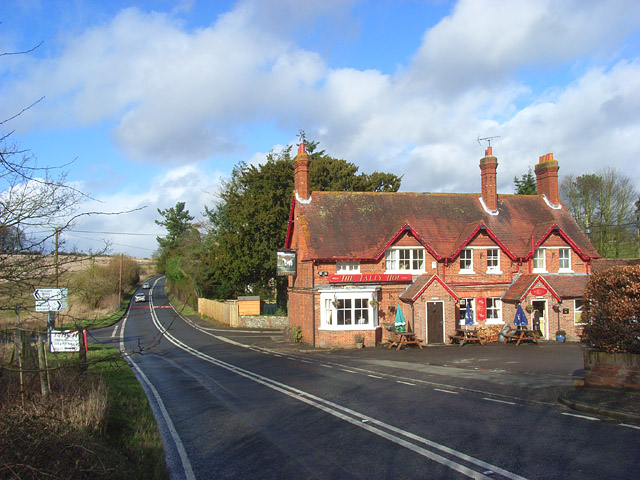
- The Tally Ho public house

- Location within Berkshire
- OS grid reference: SU356715
- Civil parish: Hungerford
- Unitary authority: West Berkshire
- Shire county: Berkshire
- Region: South East
- Country: England
- Sovereign state: United Kingdom
- Post town: Hungerford
- Postcode district: RG17
- Dialling code: 01488
- Police: Thames Valley
- Fire: Royal Berkshire
- Ambulance: South Central
- UK Parliament: Berkshire

Hungerford Newtown is a hamlet in the civil parish of Hungerford, Berkshire, England. It is south of the M4 motorway, near junction 14, on the A338, and about 3 miles (5 km) north-east of Hungerford.
