= Upper Lambourn =

Village in Berkshire, England

Coordinates: 51.520735°N 1.549031°W

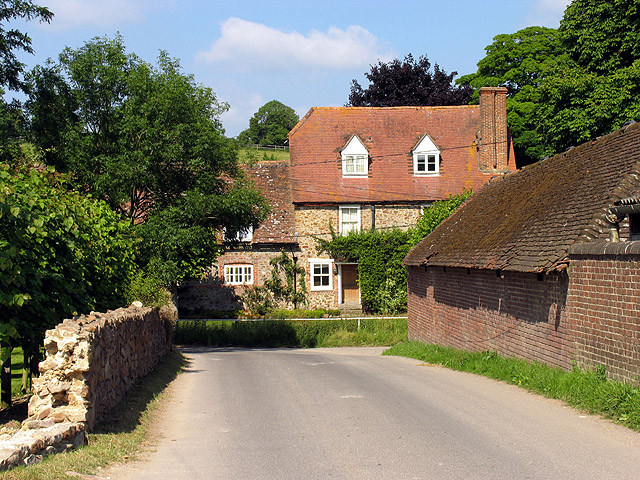
- Upper Lambourn

- Location within Berkshire
- OS grid reference: SU312803
- Civil parish: Lambourn
- Unitary authority: West Berkshire
- Ceremonial county: Berkshire
- Region: South East
- Country: England
- Sovereign state: United Kingdom
- Police: Thames Valley
- Fire: Royal Berkshire
- Ambulance: South Central
- UK Parliament: Newbury

Upper Lambourn is a small village in the county of Berkshire, England. The village is situated in the civil parish of Lambourn , and is 1.2 miles (2 km) to the north-west of the village of Lambourn, just off the Lambourn to Shrivenham road. The parish is within the district of West Berkshire, close to the point where the counties of Berkshire, Oxfordshire and Wiltshire meet.

== Geography ==
Upper Lambourn has several sites of Special Scientific Interest (SSSI) near the village, these include the famous prehistoric Seven Barrows. Other sites of SSSI near the village are Croker's Hole, Parkfarm Down and Fognam Chalk Quarry.

== See also ==
- List of places in Berkshire
- Berkshire Downs
