= Clayhill Brook =

Stream in Berkshire, England

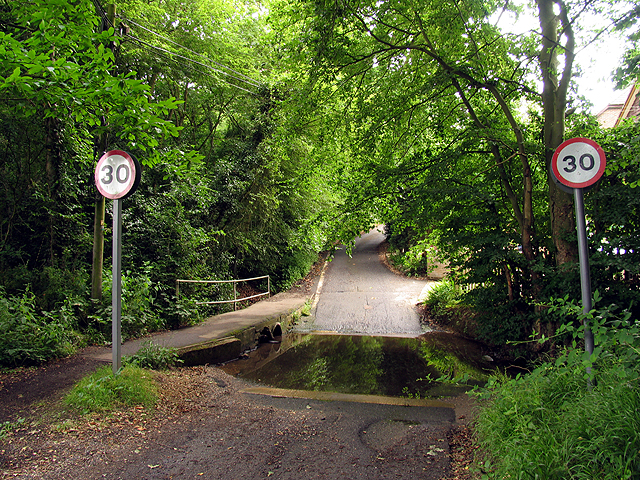
- Clayhill Brook, forded at Ash Lane in Burghfield Common, Berkshire.

Location
- Country: England
- Counties: Berkshire
- Districts / Boroughs: Burghfield Parish
- Village: Burghfield Common

Physical characteristics
- Source
  - location: Benhams Farm Burghfield Common, Burghfield Common, Berkshire, United Kingdom
  - coordinates: 51.3957°N 1.0805°W
  - elevation: 95 m (312 ft)
- Mouth: The River Kennet
  - location: Burghfield Mill, Burghfield, Berkshire, United Kingdom
  - coordinates: 51.4324°N 1.0316°W
  - elevation: 45 m (148 ft)

Clayhill Brook is a small stream in southern England, in the county of Berkshire.

== Route ==
The brook rises at Benham's Gulley in the far West of Burghfield Common and runs through the Northern edge of the Village, forming the border between Burghfield Parish and Sulhamstead Parish. The brook, running to the North East, passes through woodland, Omer's Gully, at the edge of the village. The woodland and the brook is a haven for local wildlife in the area, and is a particularly important resource in this respect. At the eastern end of Omer's Gulley, and to the North Eastern End of Burghfield Common, the brook is forded at Ash Lane. It continues North to Northeast past another woodland, Clayhill Copse, and then past Stud Farm and towards Burghfield Village. Along this course of the stream is a sewage treatment works which serves the local communities. Skirting between Burghfield Village and the hamlet of Trash Green, the brook continues Northeast, past Green Farm, under the M4 motorway, and past the gravel pits at Pingewood, running close by to Burghfield Mill. It joins the River Kennet just to the East of Burghfield Mill, no longer a working mill, but converted to residential apartments.

== Water quality ==
The Environment Agency measures the water quality of the river systems in England. Each is given an overall ecological status, which may be one of five levels: high, good, moderate, poor and bad. There are several components that are used to determine this, including biological status, which looks at the quantity and varieties of invertebrates, angiosperms and fish. Chemical status, which compares the concentrations of various chemicals against known safe concentrations, is rated good or fail.

Water quality of the Clayhill Brook in 2019:

Section	Ecological Status	Chemical Status	Overall Status	Length	Catchment	Channel
Clayhill Brook	Moderate	Fail	Moderate	5.045 km (3.135 mi)	10.068 km^{2} (3.887 sq mi)	
