= The Teg =

Stream in Berkshire, England

Location
- Country: England
- Counties: Berkshire
- Districts / Boroughs: Burghfield Parish
- Villages: Burghfield Common

Physical characteristics
- Source
  - location: Burghfield Common, Berkshire, United Kingdom
  - coordinates: 51.396°N 1.069°W
  - elevation: 90 m (300 ft)
- Mouth: Foudry Brook
  - location: Pingewood, Berkshire, United Kingdom
  - coordinates: 51.417°N 0.995°W
  - elevation: 40 m (130 ft)

The Teg is a small stream in southern England, in the county of Berkshire. It rises in Burghfield Common and flows northwards and then eastwards to join Burghfield Brook, a tributary of Foudry Brook.

== Route ==
The Teg is a freshwater stream rising close to the Willink School in Burghfield Common. The stream flowed out from a rectangular pond, which in 1911 covered 0.928 acres (0.376 ha), and headed north-eastwards, between some housing and gravel pits. There was a triangular pond covering 0.342 acres (0.138 ha) before it reached the south-eastern edge of Scratchface Copse. This section has largely been built over by planned housing estates constructed from the 1960s onwards, and even the rectangular pond has been truncated at its southern end. The brook reappears to the north of Hawksworth Road, and forms an important wildlife corridor within the village.

The stream continues through Pondhouse Copse before turning to the east and passing through the southern edge of Burghfield Village, another of Burghfield's population centres. It is culverted beneath two houses and Reading Road and then runs east, skirting south of Burghfield Manor and St. Mary's Church.

The stream turns briefly to the north-east towards Pingewood, before resuming its eastward course, in managed agricultural drainage channels. At Amners Wood, it is joined by a stream on its right bank, flowing out of the Atomic Weapons Establishment, Burghfield.

When it reaches the eastern boundary of the establishment, The Teg passes under Burnthouse Lane and continues in a straight channel between flooded gravel pits, before passing under the Reading to Basingstoke railway and joining Burghfield Brook on its left bank, near Hopkiln Farm. A short distance afterwards, Burghfield Brook passes under Kybes Lane and enters Foudry Brook.

== Bibliography ==
- Atkins (May 2007). "AWE Aldermaston, Burghfield and Blacknest Historic Characterisation and Management Strategy" (PDF). www.nuclearinfo.org. Archived (PDF) from the original on 20 July 2020.
- Burghfield PC (August 2011). "Village Design Statement" (PDF). Burghfield Parish Council. Archived (PDF) from the original on 20 July 2020.
