= Burghfield Sailing Club =

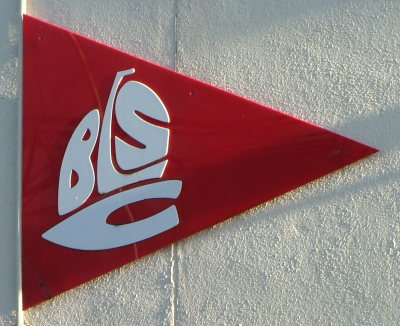
Burghfield SC

Burghfield Sailing Club (Burghfield SC or BSC) is an inland sailing club located close to the town of Theale in Berkshire near Reading in the south of England. The club and lake are easily seen from the M4 motorway as the westbound lane approaches Junction 12. BSC was one of the first Clubs in the UK to be awarded RYA Champion Club status.

== History ==
The club was founded in 1956 as the AWRE SC (Atomic Weapons Research Establishment Sailing Club). The club was principally a sea cruising group with a few dinghy sailors. Having few dinghies and no sailing water, a deal was struck with Pangbourne College, so that members were able to sail in Pangbourne's Firefly dinghies on the Thames.

In 1957 the club became recognised by the RYA and established itself on a small lake in the hamlet of Pingewood in the parish of Burghfield.

During the infamous winter of 1963 ice yachting took place and later in the year, Peter Hemment became the club's first National Champion winning in the Zenith class.

During the mid – late 1960s inter club team racing became very popular with as many as 9 matches, home and away, being held a year.

In 1969 the club became one of the first in the country to hold a personal handicap regatta, the Cock o' Burghfield, with sponsorship being provided by the local Courage Brewery.

In 1972 the club became independent of the AWRE and became Burghfield Lake Sailing Club.

In March 1977 the club moved to the nearby, and very much larger, Theale Lagoon. The club subsequently dropped 'Lake' from its name. The name Burghfield is pronounced 'Bur Field'.

The club continued to thrive for many decades as one of the Thames Valley's leading clubs.

In 2020, during the Covid-19 pandemic, the club invested in a new balcony and canopy which gives an extension to the indoor space with a fantastic view over the lake. You can typically expect to see 50 plus boats racing on a Sunday morning!

== Sailing ==
Phantom sailing at Burghfield Sailing Club

BSC provides extensive racing across a range of dinghy classes. Classes include Lasers, RS400s, RS200s, RS Aero's, Solos, Blazes. Racing is held every weekend of the year on Sundays and Wednesday evenings during the summer. The Burghfield Icicle is held on Boxing Day. The club hosts many local, regional and national open events throughout the year.

There is a successful Oppie Club which trains youngsters to sail and race Optimists and a strong junior Topper fleet. Burghfield has an enviable record in developing junior and youth talent with sailors established in the various RYA squads and competing at the top level of junior and youth sailing.

Thursday evenings the Sailability group provides sailing for the club's disabled members.

For members not wishing to compete in the club racing there is the Saturday Admiral's Club providing social sailing.

During the week when there are no organised sailing events the club is popular with windsurfers and Paddleboarders.

== Sailing successes ==
Members have been extremely successful nationally and internationally. In 1963 Peter Hemment became our first National Champion winning in the Zenith class. Crispin Read-Wilson won the Fireball World Championship in 1979 in the Netherlands. Ian and Chris Martin, have won the International 420 National Championships, the 29er National and European Championships and are currently campaigning a 49er on the Olympic Classes World Circuit.

Ian and Chris's cousin Alison Martin has also won championships in Optimists and 420s, including Bronze Medal at the World ISAF Youth Championships. Ally is currently campaigning as part of the GBR Match Race Girls team in the new Olympic Discipline of Women's Match Racing.

Mike Lyons who worked with Topper International in the development of the Blaze dinghy has won the class National Championships on many occasions. Andrew Leigh has won the Phantom National Championships. Graham Camm and Zoë Ballantine have won many National 12 National Championships. Steve Tylecote has won the Firefly National Championships and also skippered the World Team Racing Championships winning team.

Burnham's Royal Corinthian Yacht Club hosts the Endeavour Trophy annually. This is a unique and historic dinghy event which is always hotly contested with entrants limited to reigning National Champions of the classes sailed in the UK, the winners are crowned 'Champion of Champions'. Burghfield members have twice won this event. Nick and Caroline Martin and in 2007, Steve Tylecote.

== Andrew Simpson Watersports ==
Andrew Simpson Watersports our Burghfield Sailing Club's training provider. They offer training to members, schools and youth groups. They also provide training to members of the public. Their activities are dinghy sailing, windsurfing, stand up paddleboarding, improvised raft building and powerboating. Courses start for those 8 years upwards.
