= Burghfield =

Coordinates: 51°24′40″N 1°02′31″W

- Village and civil parish
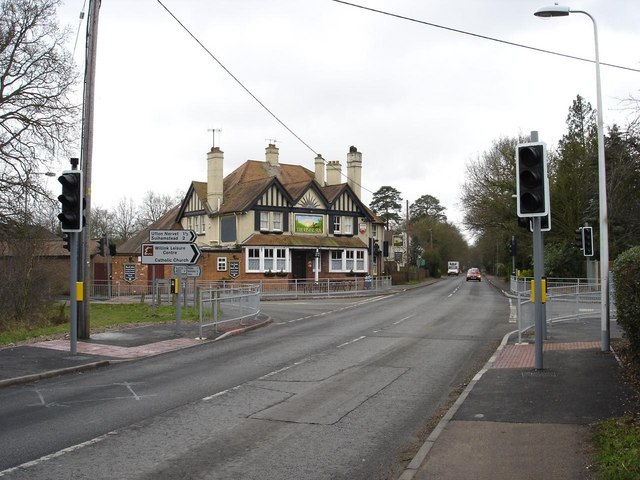
- The Rising Sun, Burghfield Common, in 2005

- Location within Berkshire
- Area: 17.11 km^{2} (6.61 sq mi)
- Population: 5,923 Berkshire Public Health Shared Team
  - Density: 346/km^{2} (900/sq mi)
- OS grid reference: SU6668
- Civil parish: Burghfield
- Unitary authority: West Berkshire
- Ceremonial county: Berkshire
- Region: South East
- Country: England
- Sovereign state: United Kingdom
- Post town: READING
- Postcode district: RG7, RG30
- Dialling code: 0118
- Police: Thames Valley
- Fire: Royal Berkshire
- Ambulance: South Central
- UK Parliament: Wokingham

Burghfield /ˈbɜːrfild/ is a village and large civil parish in West Berkshire, England, with a boundary with Reading. Burghfield can trace its history back to before the Domesday Book, and was once home to three manors: Burghfield Regis, Burghfield Abbas, and Sheffield (or Soefeld). Since the 1980s the population of Burghfield has nearly doubled with the construction of housing estates, making it a dormitory for Reading, Newbury, Basingstoke and the M4 corridor (which crosses the north of the parish).

Most of the former sparsely inhabited fields of the hamlet of Pingewood, in the north of the parish, are divided by the M4 motorway and have been converted, after gravel extraction in the mid to late 20th century, into lakes that are used for watersports, fishing, and other leisure activities. They are also a habitat for migrating geese, water fowl and other wildlife. A few higher gravel pits in this area have been drained, clay-lined and used as landfill sites.

Besides Burghfield and Pingewood, settlements in the parish include Burghfield Common, Burghfield Hill, Burghfield Bridge, Trash Green, Whitehouse Green and Sheffield Bottom.

== Etymology ==
A Burh is an Old English name for a fortified town or other defended site, (e.g., at Burgh Castle), sometimes centred upon a hill fort though always intended as a place of permanent settlement. Its origin was in military defence; "it represented only a stage, though a vitally important one, in the evolution of the medieval English Borough and of the medieval town", H. R. Loyn asserted. The boundaries of ancient burhs can often still be traced to modern urban borough limits. Most of these were founded by Alfred the Great in a consciously planned policy that was continued under his son Edward the Elder and his daughter, Æthelflaed, "Lady of the Mercians" and her husband Æthelred, Ealdorman of Mercia. A place, probably in Berkshire, appearing as Yerburghfeld, is seen in 1381. It may refer to Burghfield, or perhaps, Arborfield Other references trace the changing name of the village as follows: Borgefelle (6th Century.); Burgefeld, Berfeld (7th and 8th centuries); Burefeld (14th Century); Burfield (16th to 18th centuries).

== History ==
=== Prehistory ===
There are a number of Bronze Age sites within the parish – though many were destroyed by gravel pit workings in Pingewood, for example possible Bronze Age barrows and ditches once existed where the Burghfield sailing club is now, or under the M4 motorway. There was also a barrow cemetery at Field Farm in Pingewood, comprising ten round barrows which were visible on aerial photographs along with the cropmarks of a partially visible rectangular enclosure, and parallel ditched boundaries. Four of the barrows were excavated between 1985 and 1988 in advance of gravel extraction and were found to contain primary cremation burials, some of which were urned. Excavations have shown that this site was later used for burials when the Anglo-Saxons moved into the area. There have also been numerous finds of Bronze Age spearheads, and an axe head and a sword in the Pingewood and River Kennet area. Of Iron Age history there is only a ditch and some pits in Burghfield near Amners Farm.

=== Roman ===
There are many indications of Roman settlement in the parish. The first is a possible prehistoric or Roman settlement and field system near the River Kennet, to the west of Burghfield Mill, but now lost to gravel pits. The earthworks were visible from aerial photographs, and formed a system of fragmented conjoined rectilinear enclosures. An incomplete rectangular enclosure, measuring 12m across, could be the remains of a building. The cropmarks extend over an area measuring approximately 700m by 450m. It is possible that some of the cropmarks may relate to much later features, possibly medieval or post medieval field boundaries. Other possible Roman settlements are indicated by cropmarks in the Pingewood area slightly further to the east and to the south west. Again, some features have been lost to gravel pits.

Again in Pingewood, at Berrys Lane and Searle's Farm Lane, there are signs of a possible Roman road flanked by possible field systems and settlements, which are visible as cropmarks on aerial photographs. The side ditches of the road are visible extended in a north easterly direction for 950 m (3,120 ft). It may be part of the Roman road from Silchester to Verulamium. The settlements or field systems are defined by a series of ditches, sometimes double ditches, which are parallel and perpendicular to the road. There are three concentrations of ditch systems which appear to form fragments of a larger system of conjoined enclosures. These features have been destroyed by gravel extraction. There have been finds of Roman coins, pottery, and other artefacts in the region.

=== Anglo-Saxon period ===
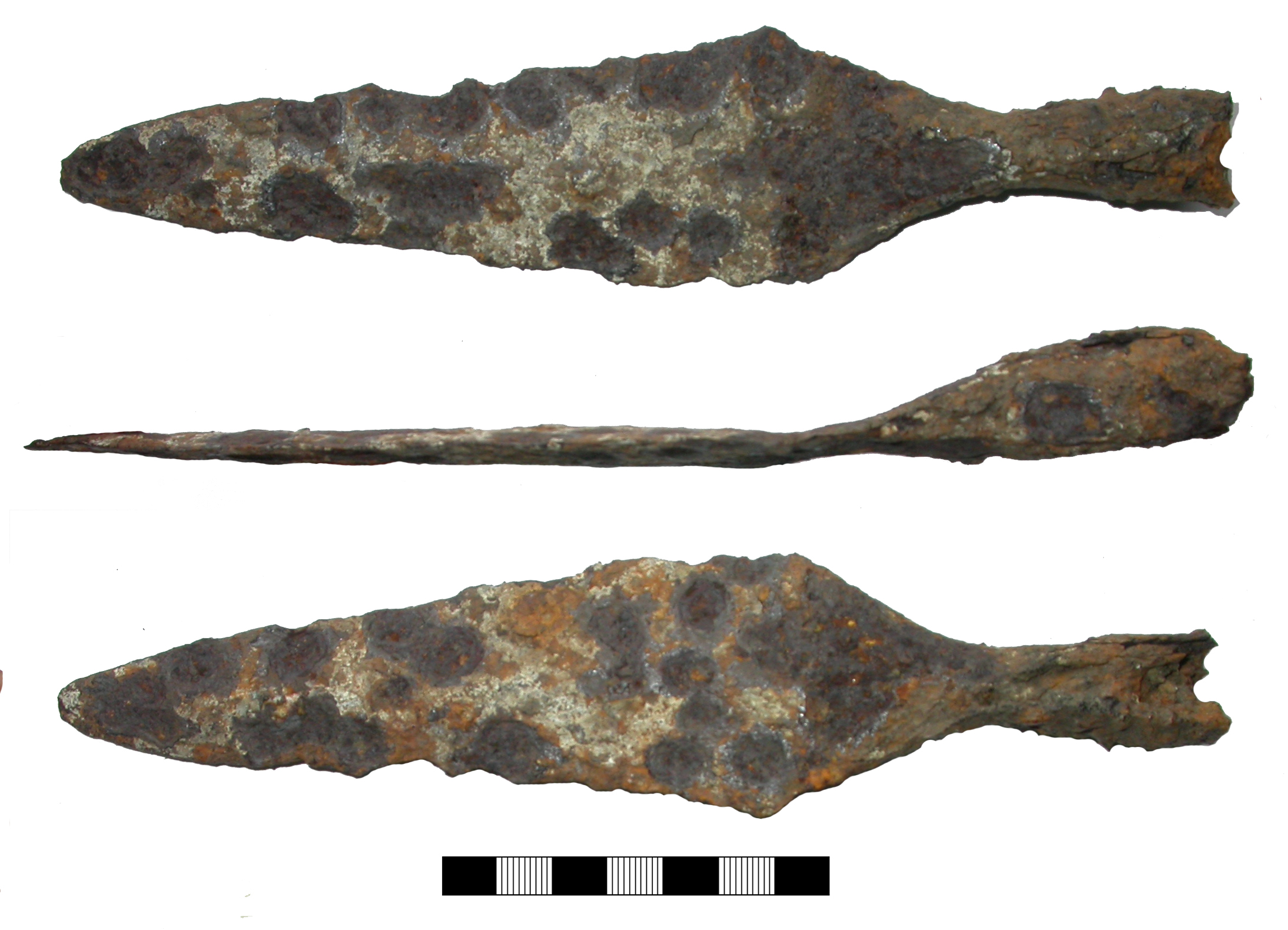
An iron spearhead from the early Anglo-Saxon period, found in Burghfield in 2000 and dated to c. 400 – c. 525

The Anglo-Saxons moved into the area in the 5th century, Burghfield appears to have been divided from very early times into two equal portions, each containing 1 1/2 hides of land, and this division is probably the origin of the two manors of Burghfield that existed later.

=== Norman era ===
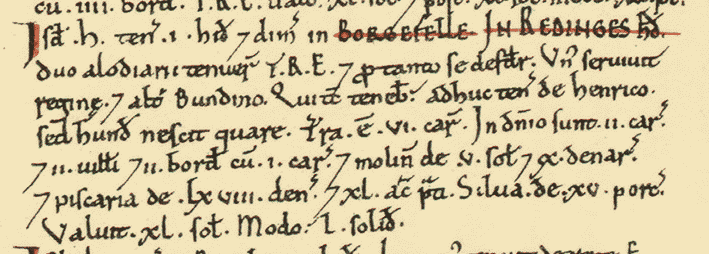
One of two entries for Burghfield in the Domesday Book

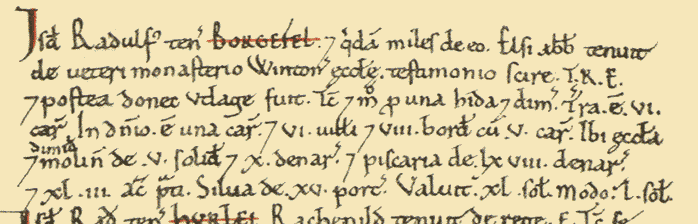
Second entry for Burghfield

Burghfield, with its two manors, is referenced twice in the Domesday Book:

The same Ralph holds Burghfield, and a certain knight holds of him. Abbot Elsi held it of the old monastery of the Church at Winchester, by witness of the shire in the time of King Edward, and afterwards until he was outlawed.

Burghfield under Ralph de Mortimer
Taxable value 1½ geld units. Taxed on 1½ Payments of 0.28 fisheries.
Value to lord in 1066 £2. Value to lord in 1086 £2½.
Households: 6 villagers. 8 smallholders.
Ploughland: 6 ploughlands (land for). 1 lord's plough teams 5 men's plough teams.
Other resources: Meadow 43 acres. Woodland 15 swine render. One-half of a mill, value 0.29. 1 fishery. 1 church.
Lord in 1066: Abbey of Ramsey St Benedict.
Overlord in 1066: Abbey off Winchester St Peter.
Lord in 1086: One man-at-arms
Tenant-in-chief in 1086: Ralph de Mortimer.

Burghfield under Henry de Ferrers
Taxable value 1½ geld units. Taxed on 1½ hides. Payments of 0.28 fisheries.
Value to lord in 1066 £2. Value to lord in 1086 £2½.
Households: 2 villagers. 2 smallholders.
Ploughland: 6 ploughlands (land for). 2 lord's plough teams and 1 men's plough teams.
Other resources: Meadow 40 acres. Woodland 15 swine render. 1 mill, value 0.29. 1 fishery.
Lord in 1066: Two freeholders.
Overlord in 1066: Bondi the constable.
Lord in 1086: Two freeholders.
Tenant-in-chief in 1086: Henry de Ferrers.

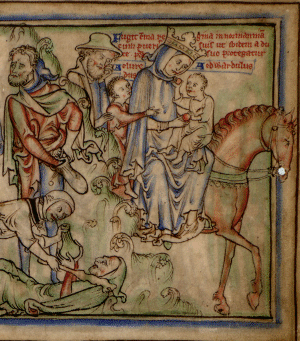
Queen Emma of Normandy

These manors formerly belonged to Queen Emma of Normandy, until her death in 1052. One half of the lands appear to have been transferred to Ralph de Mortemar around 1070, and they remained in that family until the death of Edmund, the last Earl of March in 1425. The heir to the lands was his nephew, a minor, Richard Duke of York, but on his attainder in 1459 the land passed to the Crown. The other half of Burghfield was awarded to Henry de Ferrers, a Norman soldier from a noble family who took part in the Norman conquest of England. Additionally Sir Nicholas De La Beche (1291–1345) is known to have owned Burghfield at some time. The De La Beche family were powerful landowners and knights in the 14th century. Many of them were retainers to the king, warders to the Tower of London, and Sheriffs of Oxfordshire and Berkshire. The family were influential during the reign of Edward II and Edward III, and were embroiled in the royal intrigue of the time.

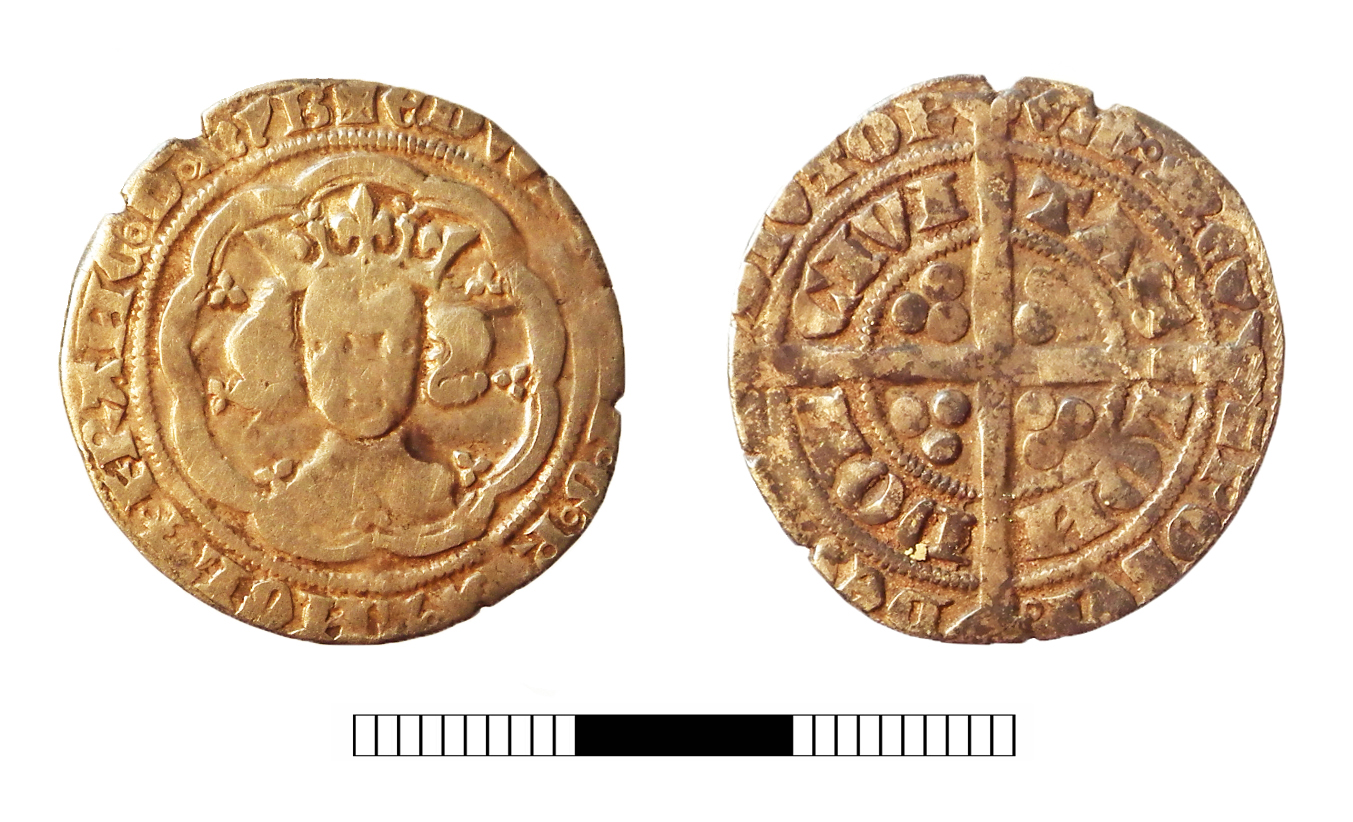
A silver groat from the reign of Edward III, found in Burghfield and dated to c. 1351 – c. 1352

The two manors in Burghfield were Burghfield Regis and Burghfield Abbas, although the current Parish of Burghfield also includes for the former manor of Sheffield (or Soefeld). King Edward IV, gave Burghfield Regis its Royal title. Its manor house, known as Nether Court, stood on the site now occupied by the rectory in Burghfield village. This manner was sub-tenanted to the family of Thomas de Burghfield, who took his name from the village, sometime before 1175. The de Burghfields were also sub-tenants of Burghfield Abbas, which had been owned by Reading Abbey from about the same time. The original Burghfield Bridge was commissioned by Matthew de Burghfield, being the lord of the latter manor in the early 13th century, but later on the family had arguments with King Edward I over who should repair it.

Sheffield Manor (originally Sewelle) was located in what is now Sheffield Bottom, at the junction of Jaques's Lane and Station Road. The manor of Sheffield was granted by the Count of Évreux to St Martin-de-Noyon, Charleval, in c. 1086, as an alien Benedictine cell, and was leased privately after 1166–67. Reading Abbey gained possession in 1270. Although known locally as the Priory, it was only a manor and later a grange with a chapel and mill.

=== Tudor and Stuart eras ===
The Williams family bought all three manors after the Dissolution of the Monasteries and the village was the childhood home of John Williams, 1st Baron Williams of Thame (1500 – 14 October 1559), an important servant of several Tudor monarchs. Upon his death, having no male heirs, the manors of Burghfield were left to his daughter Margery (Margaret Williams of Rycote) and her husband, Sir Henry Norreys. In 1560 Henry and Margery bestowed Burghfield Regis, now Burghfield Manor, and Burghfield Abbas, now Amners Court to her cousin, Nicholas Williams. Sheffield Manor was retained in the Norreys family. Moatlands Farm was apparently a moated house. It stood just south of Burghfield Mill, where the gravel pits are. In the 18th century, it was the home of the May family.

Searle's Farm is an ancient Tudor building now marooned in the middle of the gravel pits in northern Burghfield. One particular room in the house is said to be haunted. Apparently an unmarried serving girl, having discovered she was pregnant, committed suicide by throwing herself from the window during the 19th century. The Old Manor at Whitehouse Green is a small manor house built in 1685 and updated in the 20th Century. It is built of brick with vitreous headers and with an old tile gabled roof and is a Grade II listed building. Burghfield Bridge (rebuilt in stone c. 1770) is also Grade II listed.

=== 18th and 19th centuries ===
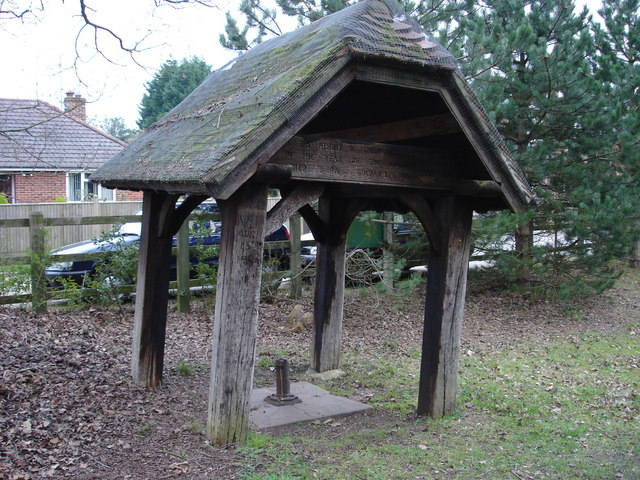
Old well in Burghfield Common

Sir Gilbert Blane (1749–1834), a Scottish physician who instituted health reform in the Royal Navy, had a country house at Culverlands near Burghfield. The house was enlarged in 1879 and was later occupied by Sir Charles Wyndham Murray MP. It is described as a plain plastered building with a balustraded parapet and slate roofs. There is an old well with an Oak framed shelter in Burghfield Common in the corner of a small village green, known locally as The Wells, in Bunces Lane and at the Junction with Springwood Lane. The shelter bears the engraved inscription: "In memory of Queen Victoria (1819–1901) in the year of the coronation of her son Edward VII 1902"

==== River Kennet mills ====
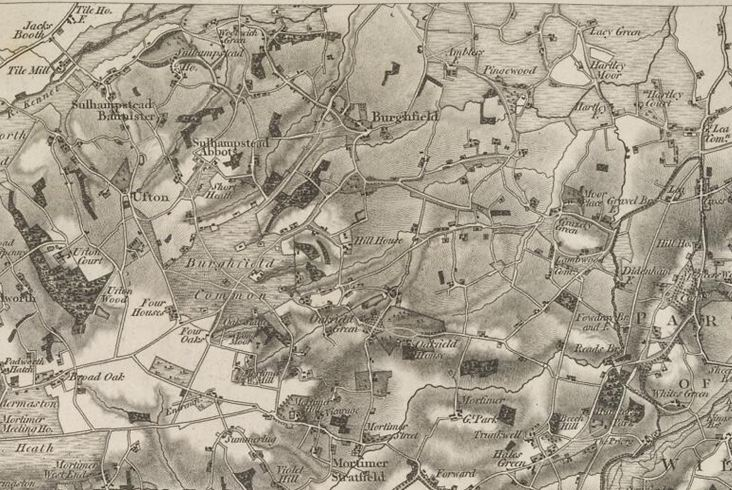
1817 Ordnance Survey Map

There were originally two mills on the River Kennet attributed to the parish, although slight changes to parish boundaries in modern times means that one mill has been lost. Burghfield Mill is a dis-used water mill to the west of Burghfield Bridge, now converted to residential apartments. The original mill of Burghfield was split in two equal portions, each attached to one of the Burghfield Manors. Sheffield Manor was served by its own mill further upstream, and is now in the neighbouring parish of Theale. In 1811 the Sheffield mill was a paper-mill, but burned down in 1877. The mill was afterwards bought by James Dewe of Burghfield Mill, who thus secured the water rights. Downstream of Burghfield lies Southecote Mill, within Southecote parish. Upstream from Sheffield lies Tyle Mill, within Sulhamstead parish.

=== World War II ===
In the early part of World War II, several wartime installations and anti-invasion measures were installed across the parish, including:

- A Royal Ordnance Explosives Filling Factory (ROF, no.18). Construction began in 1940 and production in 1942, and it was one of the last six ROFs built during World War II. In 1953 the factory was extensively reconstructed for the production of missiles. It subsequently became AWE Burghfield, responsible for the final assembly of Trident mounted nuclear warheads, their in-service maintenance and their eventual decommissioning.

Many of the former ROF workers' houses (both wooden and prefabricated single storey buildings) built along The Mearings, the road which went past the ROF's Main Gate, were removed and the road became a private one. ROF Burghfield had been linked by rail to the Reading to Basingstoke Line and the embankment for this link was still visible in the 1960s.

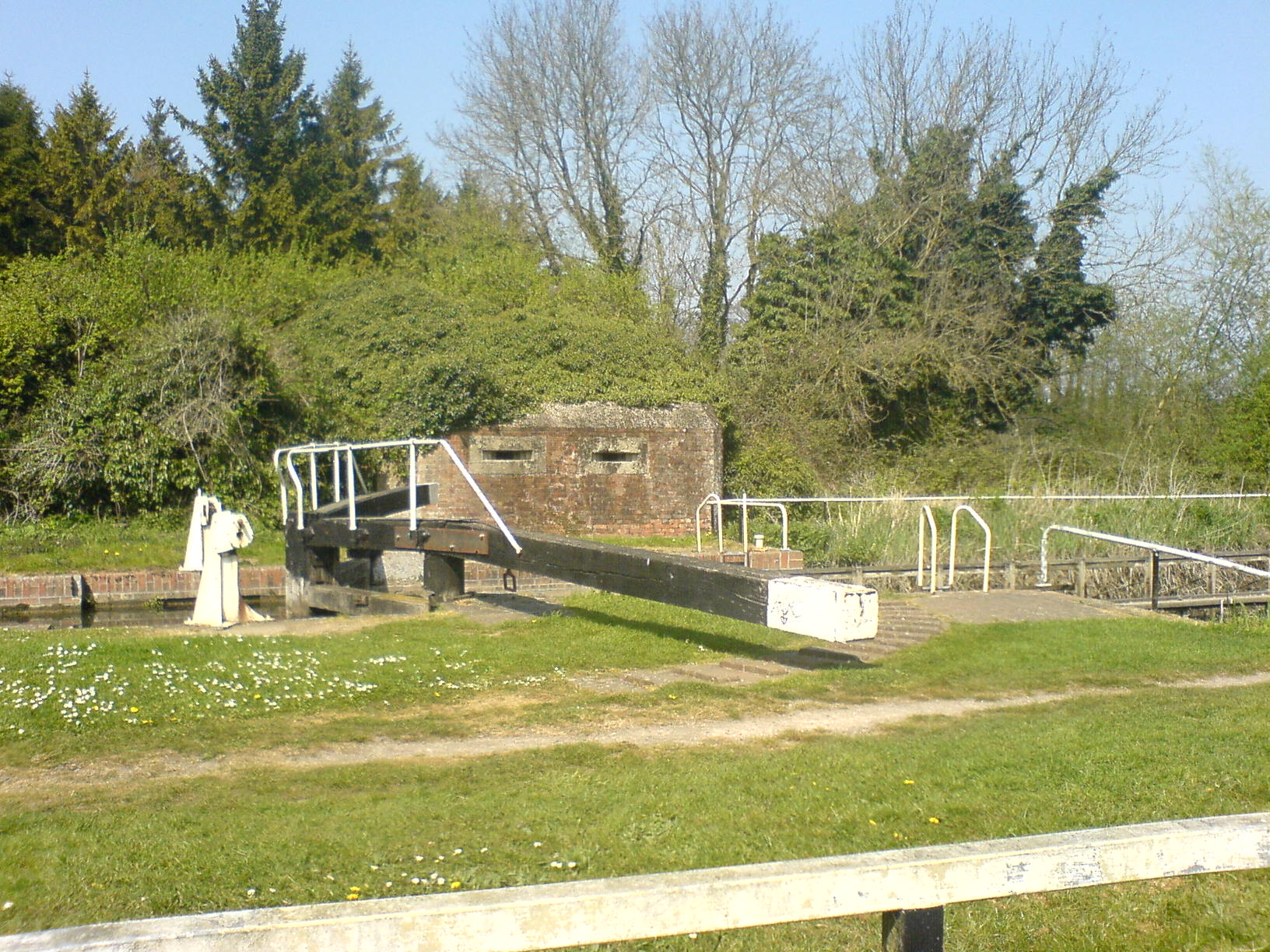
Pillbox at Garston Lock, Kennet and Avon Canal, near Burghfield

- Ten pillboxes, including:
  - One type 26 pillbox, with roofed annexe attached, in Whitley, South of Kirton's Farm Road, South-West of Reading.
  - Two type 28a anti-tank gun emplacements at Garston Lock, Kennet and Avon Canal, Theale. The first is adjacent to the lower lock gate and is also a Grade II listed building . The second is on the north bank of the Canal, almost touching the balance beam of the top gate paddle. It is in undergrowth but in good condition with the interior accessible and also in good condition. The west facing anti-tank embrasure is now obscured by bushes. Again a grade II listed building.
  - One type 22 shellproof pillbox at the edge of large open field, about 50 metres north of the Kennet and Avon canal. There is some deterioration to the outer shell but the structure is basically intact.
  - Two type 28a anti-tank gun emplacements, to the east and west of Burghfield Mill, near the river Kennet.
  - One type 22 shellproof pillbox, next to a footbridge on the north bank of the Kennet and Avon canal east of Burghfield Lock. It is surrounded by trees and bushes, but not overgrown, and internally in good condition.
  - One type 22 shellproof pillbox at Greengates in Pingewood and south of the Kennet and Avon canal.
  - One rectangular anti-tank pillbox forming part of a stop line along the Kennet and Avon Canal, at Burghfield Bridge.
  - One pillbox off Kirtons Farm Lane in Pingewood.
- An anti-tank ditch at Burghfield.
- A heavy anti-aircraft battery at Amner's Farm, Burghfield, documented as extant in 1942 when it was not armed, but today there are no remains.
- A fortified house. Iverne House is about 100 metres south of Burghfield Bridge and was originally a stable. This was converted into a two-storey shell-proof infantry strongpoint around 1941/42. There are gun ports clearly visible from the main Burghfield Road. The building was converted to a private dwelling in 1994.
- One searchlight battery, no. 508 36, at Searls Farm. It was manned by the 342nd Searchlight Battery under the command of the 35th Anti-Aircraft Battalion. The battery was operational by 1 January 1939. Searchlight sites typically comprised a small ring-ditch to provide the crew with shelter during an air raid, a predictor emplacement for calculating the height and range of targets, a light anti-aircraft machine gun pit, a generator and hutted accommodation for the crew.

Theale airfield, a military airfield opened in 1941 and closed in 1948. The airfield consisted of grass landing areas of about 900 by 800 yd (820 by 730 m), and was bounded to the north by the Kennet and Avon Canal. It was provided with Blister aircraft hangars and a Type T1 aircraft hangar. Accommodation for airforce personnel was still under construction when the airfield was already in use, and personnel were housed temporarily at the nearby requisitioned Sulhamstead House. Initially the unofficial role of the airfield had been as a relief landing ground for Woodley Airfield (under the name of Sheffield Farm), but when it was officially opened it was renamed as Theale. It was primarily used for training by the no.26 Elementary Flying Training School, and later in 1944 by the no.128 Gliding School. After the war flying ceased and the airfield was used by the Air Cadets until its closure in 1948. Subsequently, the site was bought for gravel extraction and now most of the site has been quarried away by gravel pits. Now only two small areas of the airfield remain, the north-west corner, on which stands a wooden house, and to the southwest where part of the main technical site still stands. This includes a Nissen hut, two other huts, and the 'Tl' hangar, which is used to accommodate vehicles used on the adjacent residual gravel workings.

== Governance ==
In 2001, the population of Burghfield was recorded as 5,894. In 1961, it was only 2,323. Burghfield has a parish council served by 19 parish councillors, as well as being part of the unitary authority of West Berkshire. It is part of the Parliamentary constituency of Wokingham. Burghfield has a residents' association who organise the yearly May Fayre.

=== Population ===
The number of inhabitants in the parish has slowly risen over the last two centuries, but has risen sharply in the 1980s and 1990s as modern housing developments have been undertaken, and it now has the population of a small market town.

Year	1801	1961	1981	1986	1998	2001
Population	738	2323	3662	5925	6420	6169

== Geography ==
Burghfield is about 4 miles (6.4 km) southwest of Reading. The parish, sharing in its amenities, is a dispersed settlement: Its two main populated areas are Burghfield Common and Burghfield Village; its small hamlets include Burghfield Bridge, Pingewood, Burghfield Hill, Trash Green, Whitehouse Green and Sheffield Bottom. The area is relatively large and of varying density.

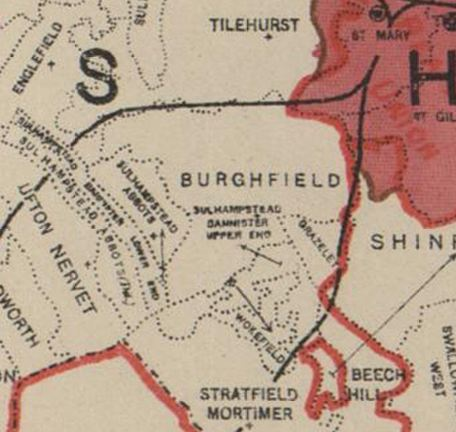
1888 Ordnance Survey Parish Boundary Map

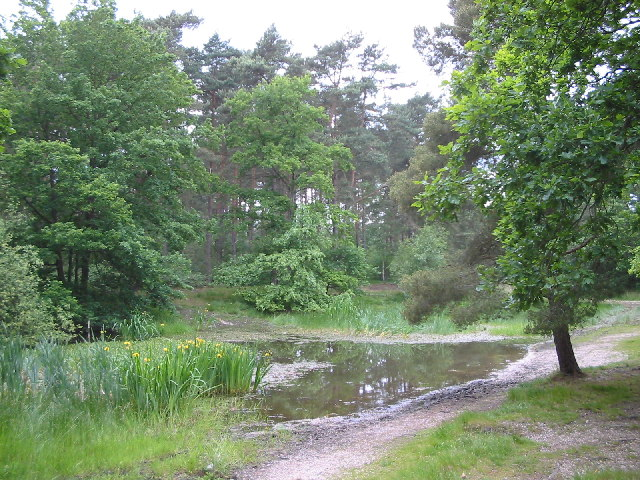
'The Newt Pond' off Goring Lane, Burghfield Common and Wokefield Common borders

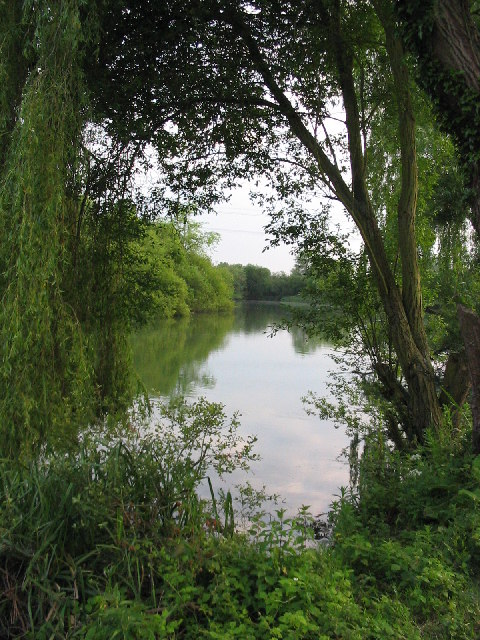
A view across the Burghfield Sailing club lake

In 1923 the parish of Burghfield had 4,309 acres of land, of which 1,660 acres were arable, 1,940 acres permanent pasture and 163 acres woods and plantations. The land lies low in the valley of the river Kennet, at an average altitude of a little over 100 feet (30 m) above the ordnance datum, rising in the south-west to a height of 302 feet (92 m). The main settlements of Burghfield parish lie along Burghfield Road, the major road out of Reading.

From north-east to south-west: Burghfield Bridge is the closest to Reading and lies by the crossing of the Reading Road over the River Kennet; this is followed by Burghfield Village, after the crossing of the Burghfield Road over the M4 motorway which runs through the north of the parish; Burghfield Hill is in the southern upland part of the parish, naturally enough, at the top of Burghfield Hill; and Burghfield Common – named after the parish common land on which it was built and with by far the largest population – lies, in quick succession, the furthest south-west. The south-eastern part of Burghfield Common is known as Great Auclum. A corner of north-western Burghfield Common is actually in Sulhamstead parish.

In the north of the parish, the Kennet Valley, is surrounded by a number of man made lakes, marshland and willow scrub, with old water meadows and Osier bed to the north of the river. Further south, between the M4 motorway and Burghfield Village the ground is flat, and consists of farmland and pastureland with occasional small stands of deciduous woodland. At Burghfield Hill, the slopes are covered in grassland and some larger copses of deciduous woodland, and are dissected by a number of partially wooded valleys and small streams such as Clayhill Brook.

The plateau gravels support grassland, deciduous woodland and Scots pine, with small areas of heath land persisting on Wokefield Common which borders Burghfield Common to the south. The grasslands within the Parish are grazed by a wide variety of cattle, sheep and horses. The parish is served by a number of footpaths and bridleways across the fields and open spaces as well as through the woods. These paths and bridleways can be enjoyed by walkers and nature lovers, and are an important resource for the Parish. There are a number of other paths and "cut-throughs" allowing pedestrians to move freely around the Parish, away from motorised traffic.

=== Geology ===
The parish lies in an area of clay, gravel and sand which was laid down in shallow, marine, coastal and fluvial river environments. The oldest sediments comprise sands deposited in a shallow sea overlain by reddish-brown Reading Formation clays. These later sediments were deposited on marshy mudflats crossed by river channels. Named after the Reading area, these largely fossil-poor clay outcrops in a narrow strip between the chalk and the overlying London Clay. The dark bluish to brownish London Clay outcrops in a broad swathe between Windsor and Burghfield, and along the valley of the River Kennet towards Newbury.

This was originally deposited in a shallow sub-tropical sea and contains the fossils of many marine animals such as bivalves, gastropods and sharks; as well as the remains of many species of plants, such as the seeds of palms, climbers, magnolias and mangroves. These can also be found in the surrounding London Clay and were probably washed out to sea by large rivers. Much of the Kennet Valley is defined as a functional flood plain, and is as a consequence subject to frequent flooding. There are areas in the flow of the river Kennet where drainage is not as good as it might be. There are also areas where the streams and rivers taking water away are nearing capacity and therefore heavy rains lead to localised flooding.

==== Gravel extraction ====
Since 1938 there has been much gravel extraction in the north of the parish, especially at Pingewood, which has led to the loss of many farms and cottages within the hamlet. In recent years the empty pits have been used for landfill waste. A number of earlier pits have been left to fill with water, and this has provided for various water sports, fishing and other leisure activities, as well as supporting a large water bird population along with other aquatic flora and fauna.

=== Flora and fauna ===
The parish includes a number of important areas for local wildlife. Of particular significance is the extensive wetland area in the Kennet Valley which has been created following the extraction of gravel from what are currently lakes, and is now a haven for a wide range of water birds and other protected bird species, such as the nightingale, and the red kite; together with kestrels, buzzards and peregrine falcons, the latter of which can often be seen on thermals enjoying this habitat of the Kennet Meadows.

==== Watercourses ====
The parish is largely bounded by rivers, brooks and streams. The Clayhill Brook partially forms its Northwestern border with Sulhamstead. This brook travels north and north-east to eventually join the River Kennet and Kennet and Avon Canal near to Burghfield Mill, to the West of Burghfield Bridge. The stream The Teg gently winds its way through the heart of Burghfield Common. Its source is close to the Willink school and much interesting wildlife can be found along its length. The Teg winds Northeast and then East to join Foudry Brook, a tributary of the River Kennet and Kennet and Avon Canal, just South of Reading.

The Burghfield Brook forms Burghfield's southern border with Wokefield and Grazeley; a notable feature of this watercourse is Pullens Pond, formed where this brook is damned by a forest access road within Wokefield Common. To the East of this area the brook continues into a small valley, referred to as Burghfield Slade, which contains a larger reservoir of water. Burghfield Brook then continues to the Northeast, and in turn feeds into Foudry Brook, just South of the Teg. Burghfields Eastern boundary is just east of the railway line, near Smallmead, running south from Reading. The northern boundary with Theale and the Southcote area of Reading is formed by the Holy Brook and the Draper's Osier Bed Stream.

To the north lie Sheffield Bottom, the River Kennet and the Kennet and Avon Canal, which run through the very north of the parish and are, today, surrounded by vast flooded gravel pits where there is much wildlife and where fishing, sailing and other watersports are popular pastimes. The Kennet and Avon Canal is crossed by road in two places near the northern borders of the parish, firstly at Burghfield Bridge, being a stone built road bridge, and secondly at Sheffield Bottom by a swing type canal bridge and a stone built road bridge. The road crossings at both are very narrow and are controlled by traffic lights. This excludes smaller footbridges, and the much later M4 motorway crossing of the Kennet and Avon Canal.

===== Hosehill Lake =====
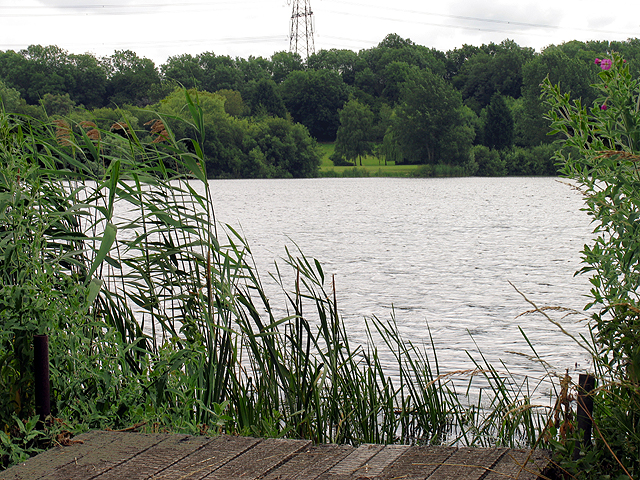
Hosehill Lake, Sheffield Bottom

In Sheffield Bottom, Hosehill Lake, a flooded gravel pit falling also within Sulhamstead parish, is listed as a nature reserve, and is managed by Berkshire, Buckinghamshire and Oxfordshire Wildlife Trust alongside the Theale Area Bird Conservation Group. The lake is bounded by a footpath, of approximately one mile, with several seating and bird viewing areas. The main entrance to the reserve is opposite the Fox and Hounds pub, Sunnyside, on Station Road, Sheffield Bottom (Theale). The site is important for its wildlife and habitats. It hosts a wide variety of water fowl in the winter, and nightingales join the butterflies and dragonflies in the spring.

==== Woodlands ====
Apart from the gravel pits, the non-residential portion of the area is mostly farmland. There are, however, still patches of scattered woodland: Bennetts Hill Copse, Brick Kiln Copse, Deans Copse, Jame's Copse, Pinge Wood, Amner's Wood, Clayhill Copse, Pondhouse Copse and Scratchface Copse. Wokefield Common in Wokefield parish is on the border with Burghfield and is accessible by public footpaths at the end of Palmers Lane and Springwood Lane, both off Bunces Lane, Burghfield Common. Omer's Gully, on the northern edge of Burghfield Common, is within Sulhamstead parish.

=== Farming ===
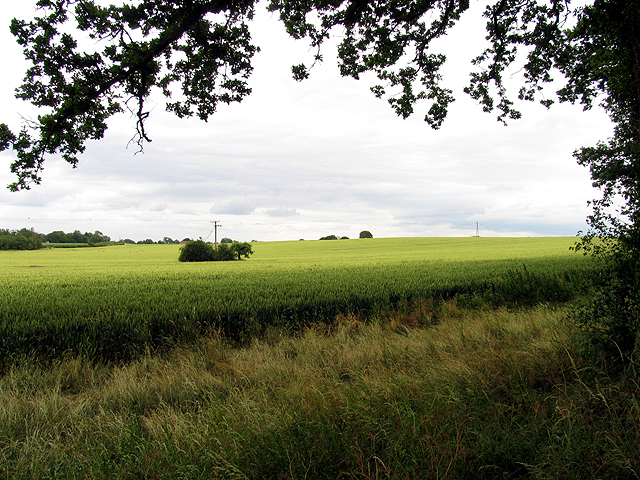
Wheat crop near Whitehouse Green, Burghfield

There are numerous farms in the parish. Many farms to the North of Burghfield are now part of the Englefield Estate.

- Amners farm
- Burghfield Farm
- Culverlands Farm
- Green Farm
- Holybrook Farm
- Hill farm
- James's Farm
- Hosehill Farm
- Knights Farm
- Kirtons Farm
- Moores Farm
- Nights Farm
- Pondhouse Farm
- Searles Farm
- Woolwichgreen Farm

== Churches ==
=== St Mary's Parish Church ===
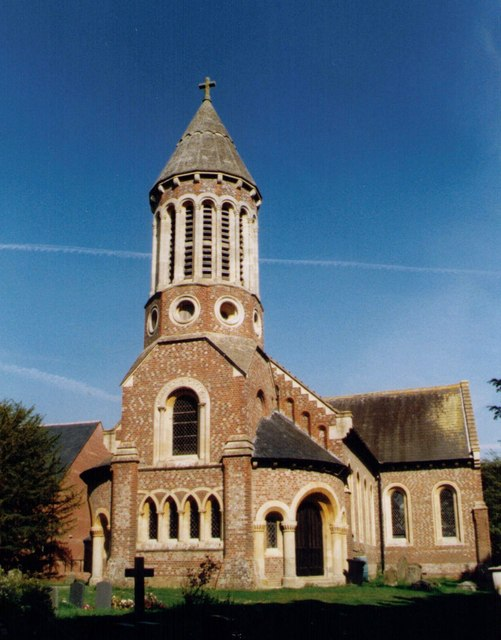
St.Mary's Church

The Church of England parish church of St Mary in Church Lane, Burghfield village, was originally built in the 12th century, but early in the Victorian era it was completely demolished and replaced by a Norman revival building designed by J.B. Clacy of Reading and completed in 1843. The original church had a stepped wooden tower, and the building is depicted in one of the stained glass windows. Other monuments from the old St. Mary's that survive in the 1843 building include a damaged early 14th century effigy of a knight, and two other recumbent stone effigies that have been defaced. There is also a memorial brass to Nicholas Williams (died 1568) and his two wives. The church has six bells hung for change ringing.

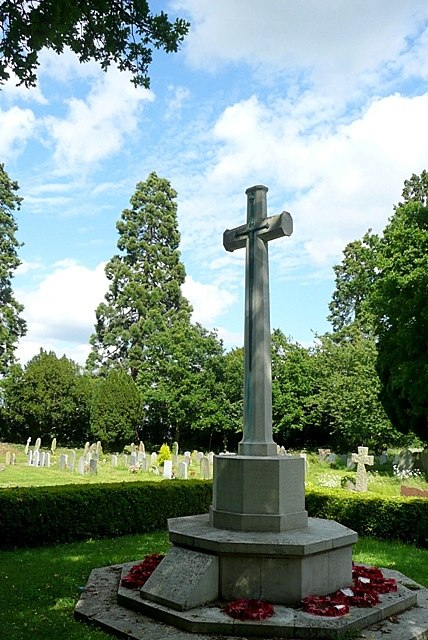
War memorial at St.Mary's Church

Bell	Weight		Inscription	Bell founder	Date dedicated
Treble	5 cwt 0 qr 1 lb	254 kg	Fear God, Honour the King.	Mears and Stainbank	20 December 1888
2nd	5 cwt 3 qr 18 lb	300 kg	Praise God in His Sanctuary, Praise Him in the firmament of His Power.	Mears and Stainbank	20 December 1888
3rd	7 cwt 0 qr 23 lb	366 kg	Let Christ be known around, And loved where'er we sound.	Mears and Stainbank	20 December 1888
4th	7 cwt 2 qr 15 lb	388 kg	Then shall true joys abound.	Mears and Stainbank	20 December 1888
5th	9 cwt 1 qr 20 lb	479 kg	Before Him lowly fall Whene'er we lift our call.	Mears and Stainbank	20 December 1888
Tenor	11 cwt 3 qr 0 lb	597 kg	And Praise Him Lord of all.	Mears and Stainbank	20 December 1888

The parish church contains a number of monuments from the old St. Mary's, including the alabaster effigy of an important historic figure, Richard Neville, 5th Earl of Salisbury the father of Warwick the Kingmaker. He fought for the Yorkist cause during the Wars of the Roses, and was executed after the Battle of Wakefield in 1460. He was buried first at Pontefract, but his son transferred his body to the family mausoleum at Bisham Priory and erected this effigy as part of his monument there. It is not clear why it was brought to Burghfield after the Dissolution of the Monasteries. The effigy of a lady alongside him wears a headdress which is not thought to be of the right date to be his wife, but she may be one of the earlier Countesses of Salisbury buried at Bisham.

=== Burghfield Common Methodist Church ===
Reverend John Ride was an evangelist who was locked up in Winchester prison for "holding a missionary meeting" in Micheldever in 1834. Released without any charge, he led open air services in Burghfield during the summer of 1835. When the regular congregation of believers grew sufficiently he formed the Methodist Society on 17 November 1835. In inclement weather, the congregation met on the premises of a local wheelwright. The first chapel was built in 1838, and was famous for its brass band. The expansion of Burghfield Common meant that the chapel was too small, and a new one was built in 1923.

=== St Oswalds Roman Catholic Church ===
The church is located at Abbey Park, Clay Hill, Burghfield Common. During the Second World War, two Douai monks, Fathers Oswald Dorman and Edward Fairhead, celebrated Mass for the hundreds of Irish who came to work in the local munitions factories at Burghfield and Grazeley Green. After the war, Mass was celebrated at Burghfield in the WRNS Hostel, Clayhill Road, which later became HMS Dauntless, and then at the old Bland's School on the Reading Road. In 1961, St. Joseph's Church Hall, Clay Hill, Burghfield, was blessed. This incorporated an old army prefab on land purchased by Father Oswald Dorman in the late 1950s. The reforms of the Second Vatican Council in the early 1960s encouraged a further spate of church building. At Burghfield in 1973, it was decided to build a new church, dedicated to St. Oswald to commemorate the great labours of Father Oswald Dorman. Designed by Lance Wright of Pangbourne, this church was opened in 1976.

== Transport ==
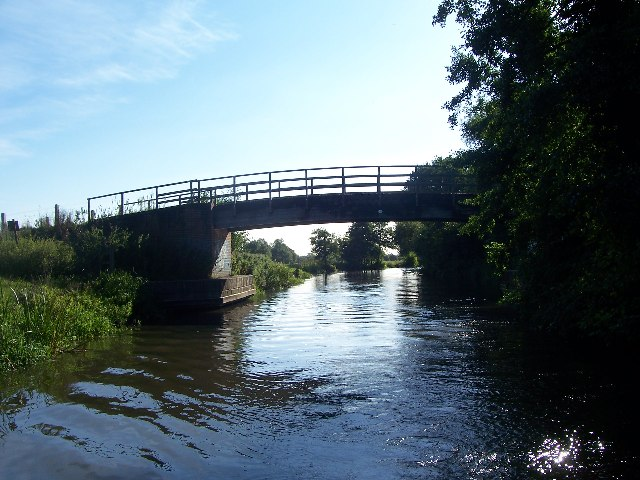
Hissey's bridge, a footbridge over the Kennet and Avon canal, near Burghfield

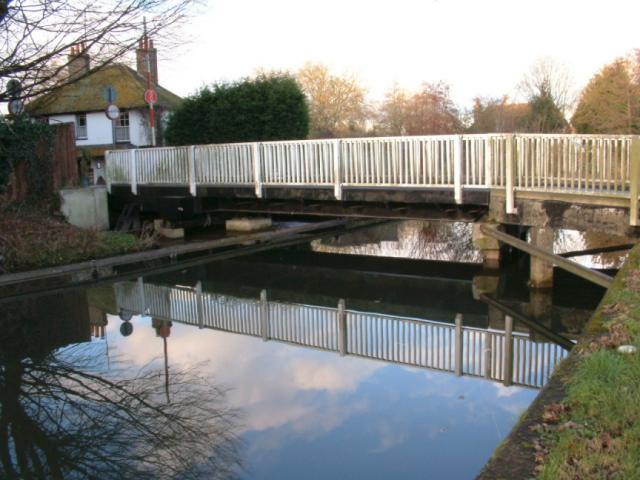
The swing bridge over the Kennet and Avon canal at Sheffield Bottom

=== Road ===
The main access road is a route from the A4 in Reading, through Burghfield to the south-western end of the parish, where the route splits in two, to continue towards Mortimer Common and Tadley respectively. This road is named Burghfield Road to the north-east of Burghfield Village, and Reading Road for the remainder of its length. The parish includes Reading services on the M4 motorway, although the nearest access point to the motorway (junction 11) is located 3.5 miles (5.6 km) to the east. Heavy vehicular access in the area is restricted by the multiple low and narrow bridges over the canal and railways which lie to the north and east.

Reading Buses operates services on Routes 2 and 2a between central Reading, Burghfield Common and Mortimer.

=== Rail ===
The nearest railway stations are Theale to the north, Reading Green Park to the north east and Mortimer to the south. From Theale, services run eastbound to Reading and London Paddington and westbound to Newbury. Reading Green Park and Mortimer are both on the Reading to Basingstoke line.

All trains at these stations are operated by Great Western Railway. The typical off-peak service frequency on both routes is two trains per hour weekdays and Saturdays and hourly on Sundays.

=== Kennet and Avon Canal ===
The Kennet and Avon Canal passes through the north of the parish. It links the River Kennet at Newbury to the River Avon at Bath, but forms just part of a larger navigation between the River Thames at Reading and the Floating Harbour at Bristol. The River Kennet was made navigable to Newbury in 1723, and the River Avon to Bath in 1727. The canal between Newbury and Bath opened in 1810. In the later 19th century and early 20th century the canal fell into disuse following competition from the Great Western Railway, who owned the canal. In the latter half of the 20th century the canal was restored, largely by volunteers, and today is a popular heritage tourism destination, for boating, canoeing, fishing, walking and cycling. It is also important for wildlife conservation. There are moorings on the Kennet and Avon Canal on the offside bank downstream of Burghfield Island and at the layby on Burghfield Island (near Burghfield Bridge). The canal has a number of locks, Sheffield Lock, Garston Lock and Burghfield Lock, and a swing-bridge along the Burghfield stretch.

== Services ==
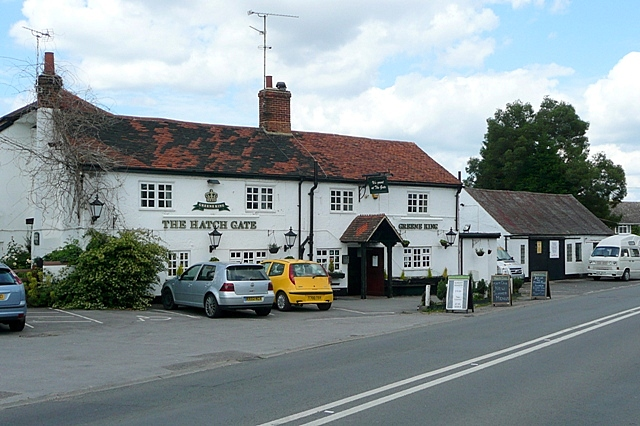
The Hatch Gate Inn, Burghfield

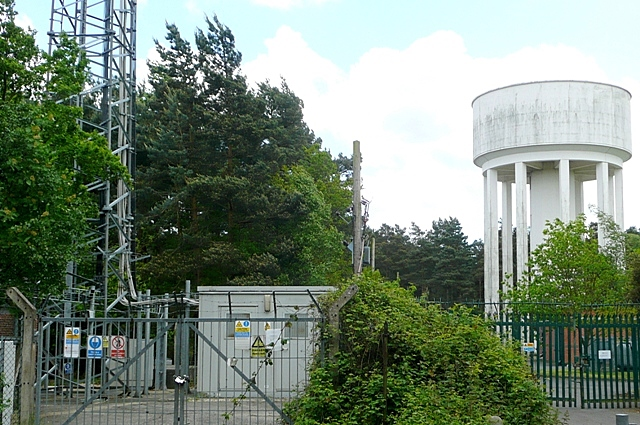
Water Tower at Burghfield Common, also showing telecoms equipment and mast.

Services in Burghfield and Burghfield Common include pubs, shops, a petrol station, restaurants and take-aways, a pharmacy, a library, a vet, a swimming pool, and a village hall.

=== Telephone exchange ===
Burghfield Common has its own telephone exchange on Reading Road, serving 2,891 residential premises, and 91 commercial premises. The exchange also covers the nearby villages of Ufton Nervet, and Sulhamstead.

=== Water ===
Burghfield Common and the surrounding villages are served by a large water tower located to the southwestern end of the village, just inside Wokefield Common. There is a small sewage works on Clayhill Brook, between Burghfield village and Trash Green.

=== Power station ===
There is a 45MW gas fired combined cycle gas turbine power station at Cottage Lane, Pingewood, known as Burghfield Generation Plant. It was opened in 1998 and is operated by Scottish and Southern Energy Generation Ltd. It required the laying of a 9 km, 200mm-diameter gas pipeline.

== Institutions ==
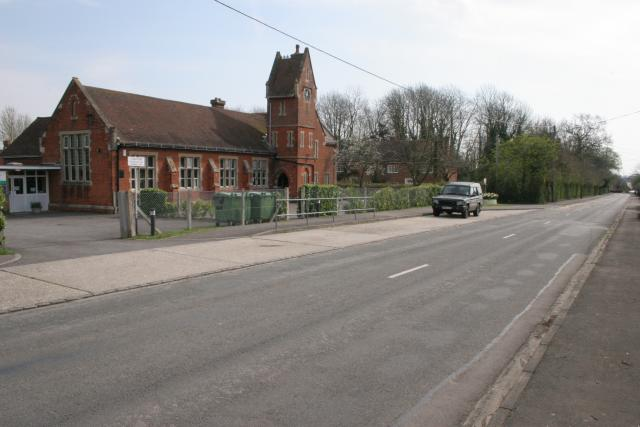
St.Mary's School, Burghfield

=== Charities ===
The headquarters of The Guide Dogs for the Blind Association is located in Burghfield Hill at Hillfields House, built for Horatio Bland in 1861–2, and the former residence of Henry George Willink. The house is a red and blue brick gabled house with a slate roof, and has been much refurbished and extended to suit the charity's needs following their purchase of the house and grounds in 1992.

=== Education ===
Education in the parish is provided by the following schools:

- Mrs Bland's Infant and Nursery School
- Burghfield St Mary's Church of England Primary School
- Garlands Junior School
- The Willink School

=== War memorials ===
There are a number of war memorials in the parish, which commemorate the local lives lost in the two great wars:

- At St. Mary's Church, Burghfield, memorial no.7784. A stone cross 5 m (16 ft) high listing the names of 37 men who died in the First World War. The monument was designed by Sir Reginald Blomfield, and was installed in 1920.
- At Sulhamstead House, memorial no.7785. A plaque within the Thames Valley Police training college, listing the names of 12 men who died in the First World War, and 8 men who lost their lives in the Second World War.

== Sports and leisure ==
Great Auclum National Speed Hill Climb was first used competitively in 1949. It closed in 1974 and is now a housing estate.

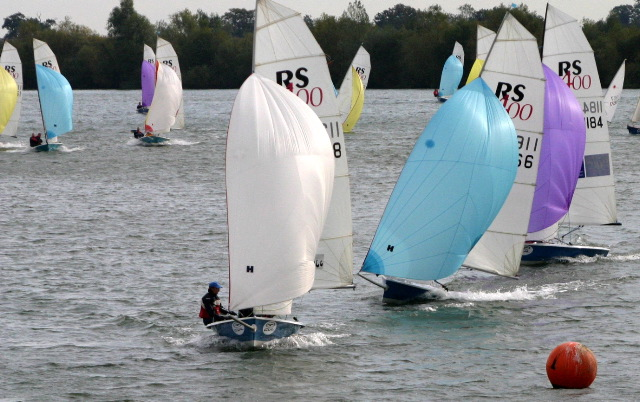
Burghfield Sailing Club

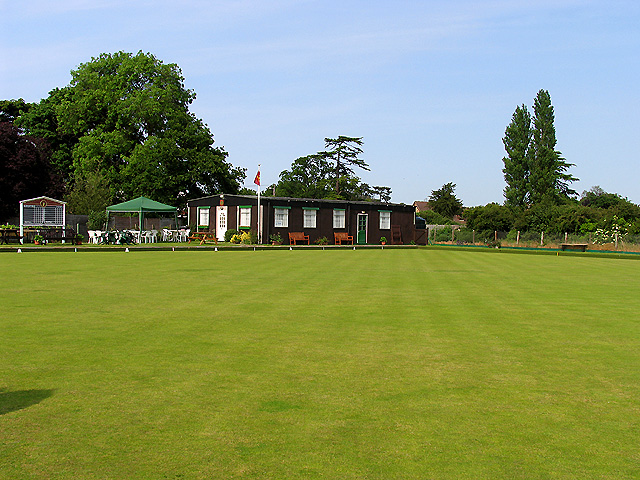
Burghfield Bowls Club

Community amenities in Burghfield include an Air Cadets squadron, a Scout troop, the Women's Institute, a horticultural society, a camera club, and a youth club. A group of community first responders operate a voluntary 999 service. Sports and leisure facilities include a bowls club, a football club, a golf course, Burghfield Sailing Club, the community sports association at ROF Burghfield, and the leisure centre at the Willink School.

== Demography ==
2011 Published Statistics: Population, home ownership and extracts from Physical Environment, surveyed in 2005
Output area	Homes owned outright	Owned with a loan	Socially rented	Privately rented	Other	km^{2} roads	km^{2} water	km^{2} domestic gardens	Usual residents	km^{2}
Civil parish	679	956	256	345	25	0.658	2.984	1.022	5955	17.11
