= Horatio Bland =

British merchant and collector

- Born: Newfoundland, Canada
- Baptised: 30 January 1804
- Died: 31 March 1876 (aged 73–74); Burghfield, Berkshire
- Occupations: Merchant and collector

Horatio Bland (1802 – 31 March 1876) was a merchant and collector of artefacts from around the world. He set up a private museum in Berkshire and his collection founded Reading Museum in 1882.

== Childhood ==
Bland was born in about 1802 at Bonavista, Trinity Bay, Newfoundland, Canada. His parents were John (1760–1826) and Sarah Bland (1726–1836). John Bland was born in Devon and had arrived in Newfoundland and married Sarah Bland by 1789. He was probably a merchant's agent, first becoming a magistrate and in 1809 he was appointed High Sheriff of Newfoundland. He took a special interest in the welfare of the indigenous people, the Beothuk, particularly condemning fisherman and furriers for their treatment and alienation of the Beothuks.

== Business life ==
Bland left Newfoundland in about 1823, spending time in New York and Liverpool. By 1838 he was in South America where he went into business with William Joseph Myers, a Liverpool merchant. They set up a merchant house at the port of Valparaiso in Chile, trading as Myers, Bland and Company. In the 1830s Bland was speculating on a new agricultural fertilizer, guano, the accumulated droppings of sea birds over many centuries. In July 1839 through the Myers, Bland and Company he sent thirty bags of guano to Liverpool from Valparaiso on board the ship Heroine.

== Personal life ==
In 1838 in Valparasio, Chile, Bland had a son Horatio Bland Guerra. By the 1840s a wealthy Bland moved to England, where on 3 August 1847 he married Emily Alicia Cherry (1826–1868), the oldest daughter of the Rector of Burghfield Rev Henry Curtis Cherry and his first wife Anne Alicia Cameron. The Bland's lived in a large Georgian house called Culverlands at Burghfield Hill. Bland also owned adjoining land at Burghfield Common and in 1855 he bought Hartley Grange at Hartley Witney, Hampshire.

Bland's wife Emily Bland died on a trip to Jerusalem in March 1868 where she is buried in the Protestant Cemetery. Bland founded Mrs Bland's School at Burghfield Common in memory of his wife. The school bell was a large Japanese temple bell dating to 1746 that Bland had collected on his travels. In 1953 it was given to the Ashmolean Museum, Oxford.

== Family scandal ==
Family scandal in the courts made the newspapers in 1850s. Emily Bland's father, Rev Henry Cherry attempted kidnapping his second wife Emily Mary Sutherland. She wanted to leave the marriage and applied to the court of Queen's bench to protect her, while Cherry applied in 1858 a suit for restitution of conjugal rights.

== New Home and Museum ==
In 1861 Bland commissioned the architect Walter Scott of Liverpool to design a new red and blue brick gabled house with a slate roof on his land at Burghfield Common called Hillfields. Hillfields was constructed at a cost of £2961. Today it is the headquarters for Guide Dogs for the Blind. He had a "detached Brick and Slated Building erected for a Museum" according to the 1892 Hillfields house sale catalogue.

In 1874 Bland built a new museum in Burghfield for his growing museum collection, replacing the smaller museum building at Hillfields. The eclectic collection and museum was described by Dr Joseph Stevens, the first curator of Reading Museum. It contained a stuffed lion, kangaroo and platypus, marine shells from Australia, Papua and Philippines, pottery from ancient Egypt, Greece and Peru, and weapons and implements from Africa and the Pacific.

== Legacy ==
Bland died on 31 March 1876, aged 73, and was buried at St Mary's churchyard, Burghfield. He gave Hillfields house to his nephew Thomas Bland Garland, another property to nephew Marcus Horatio Bland and the residue of his estate to his son Horatio Bland Guerra. Bland Garland offered the Bland Collection to Reading Corporation in 1877. New museum galleries were built at Reading Town Hall and the collection was permanently transferred to Reading Museum in September 1882.
