= Burghfield Bridge =

Coordinates: 51°25′48″N 1°01′24″W

- Hamlet
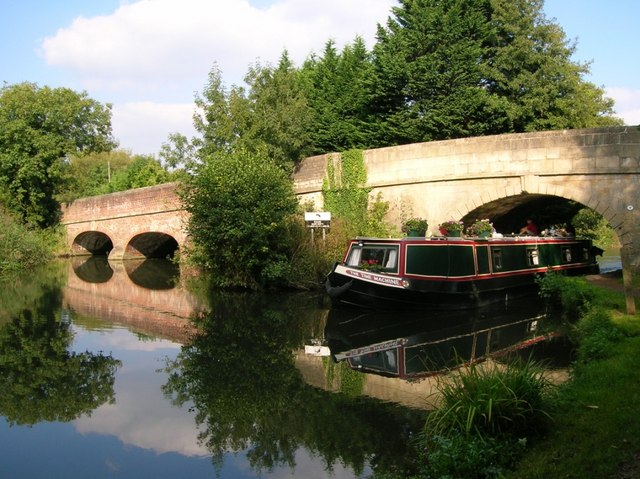
- Burghfield Bridge

- Location within Berkshire
- OS grid reference: SU680706
- Metropolitan borough: West Berkshire
- Metropolitan county: Berkshire
- Region: South East
- Country: England
- Sovereign state: United Kingdom
- Post town: READING
- Postcode district: RG30
- Dialling code: 0118
- Police: Thames Valley
- Fire: Royal Berkshire
- Ambulance: South Central
- UK Parliament: Wokingham

Burghfield Bridge is a hamlet in the civil parish of Burghfield in Berkshire, England. The settlement is situated between the village of Burghfield and the Reading suburb of Southcote.

== History ==
=== The bridge ===
The hamlet is named after the bridge crossing the River Kennet on the Kennet Navigation. The river was first crossed in the area in the thirteenth century by the Lord of the manor, Matthew. The original Burghfield Bridge was built by the De Burghfield family, but they had arguments with King Edward I over who should repair it. There was a minor skirmish there after the First Battle of Newbury in 1643. The current bridge was built c. 1812 and is a Grade II listed structure. Burghfield Mill, located on the Kennet, was at times used to mill corn and cocoa. Near to the mill, on the navigation, is Burghfield Lock.

=== World War II ===
In the early Part of World War II, several anti-invasion measures were installed across the borough, including a fortified house at Burghfield Bridge. Iverne House, now a private dwelling, is situated 100 metres (330 ft) to the south of the bridge and was originally a stables. During the war it was converted into a two-storey shell-proof infantry strongpoint, and gun ports are visible from the road.

== Local legend ==
The pub at Burghfield Bridge is named after the local legend of the Cunning Man. Various stories exist regarding the legend, citing the Cunning Man as a wizard from nearby Tadley, who was able to heal ailments and broken relationships. Another explanation is that another local building was built by a "cunning man" using bricks placed on their sides to use less building materials.

== Transport ==
Burghfield Bridge is served by Reading Buses routes 2, 2a and 2b. The hamlet is located near to Reading services on the M4 motorway, although the nearest access point to the road is at junction 11, 2.5 miles (4.0 km) to the south-east. The nearest railway stations to the hamlet is Reading Green Park.
