= Sheffield Lock =

Coordinates: 51°25′51″N 1°04′07″W

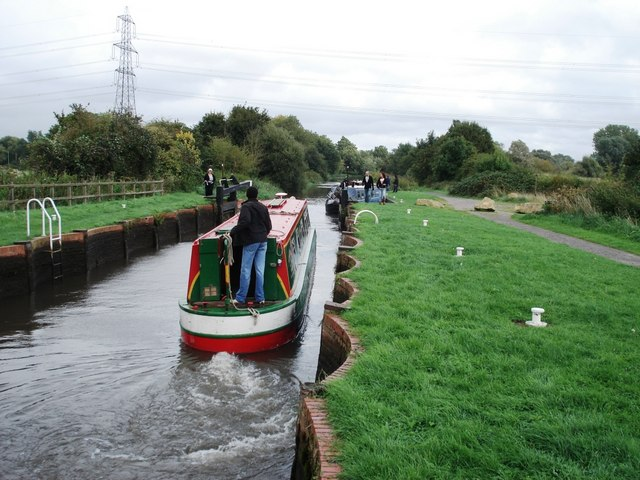
- Sheffield Lock, with its scalloped walls

- Location within Berkshire
- Type: Canal lock
- Location: Burghfield
- OS grid reference: SU 648706

History
- Built: 1718–1723
- Rebuilt: mid 18th century

Site notes
- Area: Berkshire
- Architect: John Hore
- Governing body: Canal and River Trust

Listed Building – Grade II
- Official name: Sheffield Lock at SU 648706
- Designated: 6 December 1990
- Reference no.: 1319599

Scheduled monument
- Official name: Sheffield (or Shenfield) Lock
- Reference no.: 1006972

Sheffield Lock, at grid reference SU648706, is a lock on the Kennet and Avon Canal, in the civil parish of Burghfield in the English county of Berkshire. It is also sometimes known as Shenfield Lock.

== History ==
Sheffield Lock was built between 1718 and 1723 under the supervision of the engineer John Hore of Newbury, and this stretch of the river is now administered by the Canal & River Trust as part of the Kennet Navigation. It has a change in level of 2 ft 2 in (0.66 m).

The lock was built in the early 18th century and was originally turf-sided. It was enlarged in the mid 18th century to cope with larger "Newbury barges" and has 20th century alterations. It consists of brick chamber walls of 11 scalloped bays, with brick coping and has 2 sets of double wooden gates, all with mechanical gate paddle gearing. The lock is Grade II listed, and a scheduled monument.

== See also ==
- Locks on the Kennet and Avon Canal

Next lock upstream	River Kennet / Kennet and Avon Canal	Next lock downstream
Sulhamstead Lock	Sheffield Lock; Grid reference: SU648706	Garston Lock
