= Pingewood =

Hamlet in Berkshire, England

Coordinates: 51.4189°N 1.0055°W

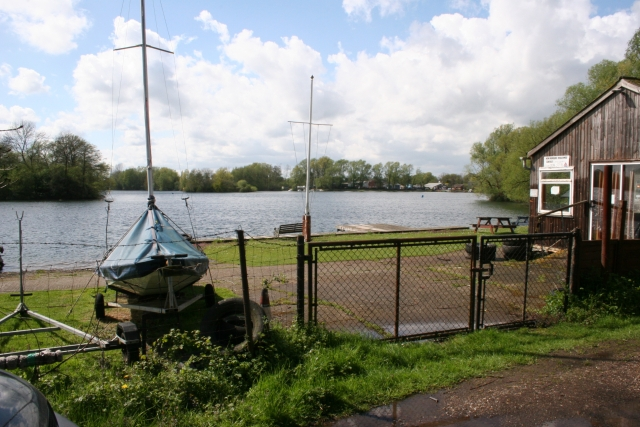
- Gravel pits at Pingewood

- Location within Berkshire
- OS grid reference: SU692693
- Metropolitan borough: West Berkshire
- Metropolitan county: Berkshire
- Region: South East
- Country: England
- Sovereign state: United Kingdom
- Post town: READING
- Postcode district: RG30
- Dialling code: 0118
- Police: Thames Valley
- Fire: Royal Berkshire
- Ambulance: South Central
- UK Parliament: Berkshire

Pingewood is a hamlet in the civil parish of Burghfield, to the south of Reading, in the English county of Berkshire. It lies to the Southwest of Burghfield Bridge.

== Etymology ==
The name Pingewood is thought to derive from the Common Brittonic words corresponding to modern Welsh penn ("head, peak, tip or end") and coed ("wood"). When Old English became the dominant language in the area, around the fifth century, Old English-speakers added their own descriptive word wood on the end. A survey of Celtic place-names in England, by Richard Coates and Andrew Breeze, marks this interpretation as uncertain, but they do include the name in their gazetteer of Celtic place-names.

== History ==
Until 1938, Pingewood was a peaceful little hamlet with country lanes and high hedges. In the centre of the hamlet was Kirton's Farm, located at the north end of a road that ran north to south, parallel to the Reading to Basingstoke railway but a little further to the west. There were 13 cottages, with a Church school at the southern end of the road, a large village green with a Coronation seat, and a smallholding called Moore's Farm. At both ends of the road, it curved to the east to cross the railway, and there was also a pond by the northern crossing, dug out when the railway bridge was built. Around the copse were more cottages, all being pulled down under a system known as 'quit-rent'. In one of these lived a woman reputed to be a witch. A little further to the north was Cottage Lane, with farm buildings and cottages.

== Gravel pits ==
By 1938 excavation had begun in the gravel pits. Because of the high water table, these pits then filled naturally with water to form Pingewood Lake which covers about 50 acres (20 ha). The footpaths vanished, with trees and cowslips, as more land was taken. The school closed in 1958, the farms disappeared - replaced by sailing, water skiing and other water-sports.

In the 1960s, the M4 motorway cut the hamlet in half. Kirtons Farm is now a hotel and Knights Farm is derelict. The original Kirtons Farmhouse was an H-plan building dating from the 16th century, which was subsequently altered in the 18th and 20th centuries. Most of the ground floor is constructed of painted brick, while the first floor is timber framed, with brick infill. Knights Farm dates from the late 18th century, with 19th century additions, and 20th century alterations. It is a 2-storey building with an attic. The land south of Pingewood is a huge landfill.

== Streams and brooks ==
Streams and brooks criss-cross the hamlet. To the south, and running west to east, flows The Teg, which joins Burghfield Brook on the south-eastern boundary of the hamlet. Burghfield Brook acts as the boundary for West Berkshire on both sides of the junction, and continues for a short distance to the north-east, where it joins Foudry Brook, a tributary of the River Kennet.

== Haunted house ==
Searle's Farm is an ancient Tudor building now in the middle of the gravel pits. Legend has it that, sometime in the 19th century, an unmarried serving girl found that she was pregnant and committed suicide by throwing herself from one of the windows. It is said that a soft white light is seen coming from under the door to that room. Several visitors claim to have the same dream while sleeping in the room. A young girl in a flowing white dress is seen at the window, staring out over the surrounding countryside. She is illuminated in a soft white light.
