= Heston MSA =

Motorway service station in the London Borough of Hounslow

Heston Services
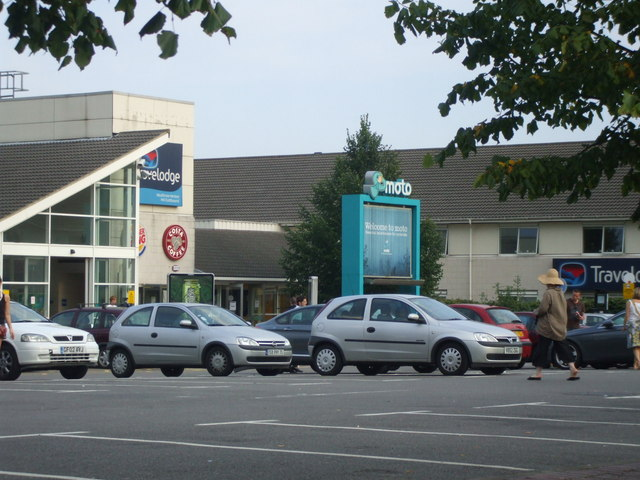
- The eastbound services building.

- Location within Greater London

Information
- County: Greater London
- Road: M4
- Coordinates: 51.4881°N 0.3911°W
- Operator: Moto Hospitality
- Website: moto-way.com/services/heston-westbound/

Heston services is a motorway service station on the M4 motorway in the London Borough of Hounslow, built on land that once formed part of the now defunct Heston Aerodrome.

== History ==
It is owned by Moto. The 11-mile £19m Chiswick-Langley section of the M4 (London - South Wales Motorway) opened on Wednesday 24 March 1965, together with the Heathrow Airport spur.

=== Planning ===
Consulting engineers were Sir Alexander Gibb & Partners, and it was built by Costain, with 16 acres on each side. The 11 miles of M4 from Chiswick to Langley were the first to be computer controlled from the police centre at Heston services, with digital motorway signs in March 1969, opened by Labour minister Richard Marsh, Baron Marsh. GEC received the £120,000 contract in March 1968, with 57 illuminated signs.

=== Construction ===
A contract was awarded in September 1966, with each side to have a 21,000 sq ft restaurant building. There would be 46 pumps, on 12 islands, holding 210,000 gallons of petrol. The Chiswick - Langley M4 section was the busiest in the country, and the first motorway section to be lit, with a £100,000 lighting contract in October 1966.

During construction of this section, much vandalism took place near Harmondsworth and Harlington. The lighting of the site was provided by the street lighting division of British Lighting Industries. The 100 ft main lighting columns were supplied by British Steel Corporation's Northern and Tubes Group (Stewarts & Lloyds).

=== Out of London ===
The westbound side was opened on 4 March 1967. It had 46 petrol pumps. It was opened by Granada Ltd, and was their third service area after Toddington (1964) and Frankley (1966). It had been planned to open in July 1966. When the westbound side opened, it was planned that the restaurant would open around September 1967. The first restaurant on the westbound opened on Wednesday 22 November 1967, when nothing on the eastbound side was open. There was a self service restaurant for 220, a transport cafeteria for 120, and waitress service restaurant for 94. The eastbound side was planned to open soon after.

The westbound section is accessed via Phoenix Way, and is adjacent to the site where most of the Heston Aerodrome buildings were located.

The 2019 Motorway Services User Survey found that Heston's westbound side was in the top five motorway services in the UK for customer satisfaction.

=== Into London ===
The eastbound side was opened on Wednesday 3 January 1968 by the then Miss United Kingdom, Jennifer Lynn Lewis and entertainer Joe Brown. The eastbound side was opened to public the next day. The site could seat 750 people, 400 cars, with 250 lorries and coaches.

The whole project had cost £500,000.

== Location ==
Heston services is located between junctions 2 (Brentford Interchange, Lionel Road) and 3 (A312, Cranford Parkway Interchange) of the M4, near the suburbs of Heston and Cranford. It is one of only two motorway service stations within the M25; the other is London Gateway services (formerly Scratchwood services) on the M1, which opened in 1969.

Directly west of the westbound side is the British Airways sports ground; on the west of the sports ground was their Concorde Centre, now known as Heston Venue. The service station is in the TW5 postcode. Further west is Cranford Park.

== Popular culture ==
Roger Moore is mentioned as passing Heston Services when supposedly on his way to appear in the first episode of Knowing Me Knowing You with Alan Partridge.

Heston services made a short but pivotal appearance in Edgar Wright's 2007 film Hot Fuzz.

Bryn from BBC’s Gavin & Stacey mentions, in the early episodes in the series, making a scheduled stop at either Leigh Delamere or Heston services on the family’s first trip from Barry Island to Billericay. In the 2019 Christmas Special, Nessa says, "Only a fool'd stop at Heston."

Next eastbound: None	Motorway service stations on the M4 motorway	Next westbound: Reading
