= The Willink School =

Location
- School Lane; Reading, Berkshire, RG7 3XJ; United Kingdom; 51.396°N 1.0704°W

Information
- Type: Comprehensive community school
- Motto: Fides et Amor (Faith and Love)
- Established: 1957
- Local authority: West Berkshire
- Department for Education URN: 110048 Tables
- Ofsted: Reports
- Chair of Governors: Alison Kerevan
- Headteacher: Nicolle Browning
- Gender: Co-educational
- Age: 11 to 18
- Enrolment: 1,218
- Houses: Berlin; London; Mexico; New York; Paris; Shanghai; Tokyo
- Publication: WeLink
- Website: willinkschool.org.uk

The Willink School is a comprehensive community school in Burghfield Common, Berkshire, United Kingdom. Founded in 1957, the school is co-educational and has an enrolment of 1,218 students aged 11–18. The headteacher is Nicolle Browning.

== History ==
The school opened on 8 January 1957 as a secondary modern with an enrolment of 245. It was named after Henry George Willink (1851–1938), the former chairman of the Berkshire County Education Committee who lived in Burghfield.

The school underwent significant expansion in the 1970s, and in the 1980s a leisure centre was built as part of the site. In 1996, the school became one of the first in the country (and the first in Berkshire) to be awarded Language College status. The leisure centre was expanded in 1997 to include a 25-metre (27 yd) swimming pool. By the end of the decade, enrolment at the school had reached 789. In 2005 it had risen to 927, and had reached 1,030 by the time of the school's 2012 Ofsted inspection.

== Admissions ==
The school is a co-educational comprehensive, and as such is non-selective in its admissions at Key Stage 3 and 4. Its current enrolment—from Year 7 to Year 13—is 1,218; of these, 228 are in the sixth form. The school's planned admission numbers for each year group in the 2022–23 academic year was 208; the actual intake that academic year was 206.

Feeder schools for the Willink include primary schools in Aldermaston, Burghfield and Burghfield Common, Mortimer, and Ufton Nervet, although the school reports admissions from schools across Berkshire and north Hampshire.

Admission to the sixth form is selective, with offers dependent on predicted GCSE grades as well as an entrance interview. The majority of students continue into the Willink sixth form after Year 11, although a large minority undertake Key Stage 5 education elsewhere. A small minority was recorded as having entered apprenticeships.

== Governance ==
The school governing body consists of 20 governors. The current chair of the governing body is Alison Kerevan.

Operationally, the school is led by a seven-member senior leadership team comprising the head teacher, a deputy head teacher, three assistant head teachers, an assistant deputy head, and the data manager. The school's headteacher is Nicolle Browning who took up the position at the beginning of the 2023–24 academic year.

=== Headteachers ===
The school has had five headteachers. Noel Jackson served from 1957 to 1980. He was succeeded by Mary Hulbert, who retired in 1993 and received an OBE in the 1993 Birthday Honours for services to education. Barbara Wynn was headteacher from 1993 to 2007. She was succeeded by Peter Fry, who served until 2023 when Nicolle Browning took office.

== Inspections ==
At its most recent full Ofsted inspection, carried out in February 2014, the Willink School was judged to be "good", with behaviour and safety described as "outstanding". A short follow-up inspection in 2018 stated that the school continued to be "good". Results of that year's Ofsted Parent View, in which the body allows parents, carers, and guardians to feedback opinions about educational establishments, showed that 95% of agreed that children were happy at the school and 97% agreed that they were safe. Behaviour and bullying received the most criticism, with 10% of parents believing that behaviour was not well managed and 8% believing that bullying was not effectively dealt with.

The school's three previous inspection reports graded it "satisfactory" (2009 and 2012) or "good" (2005).

== Attainment ==
At GCSE level, 69% of students during the 2021–22 academic year achieved grade 5 or above in English and Mathematics; the West Berkshire average was 55% and the national average 50%. At A-Level, the school had a 100% pass rate with 91% of students achieving A*–C and 38% attaining A* or A grades. Undergraduate degree courses favoured by the highest-achieving students that year were those involving computer science, with those students going to study at either the University of Southampton or the University of Bristol.

== Pastoral ==
The school uses a house system; since 2005 the houses have taken their names from major global cities. The current system of seven houses (Berlin, London, Mexico, New York, Paris, Shanghai, and Tokyo) was adopted in September 2021; between 2005 and 2021 the houses were Barcelona, London, Milan, New York, Paris, and Sydney. Prior to this, the school consisted of four houses named after local manors (Abbots, Bannister, Ufton, and Wokefield).
