= Garston Lock =

Canal lock in Berkshire, England

Coordinates: 51.43153°N 1.05919°W

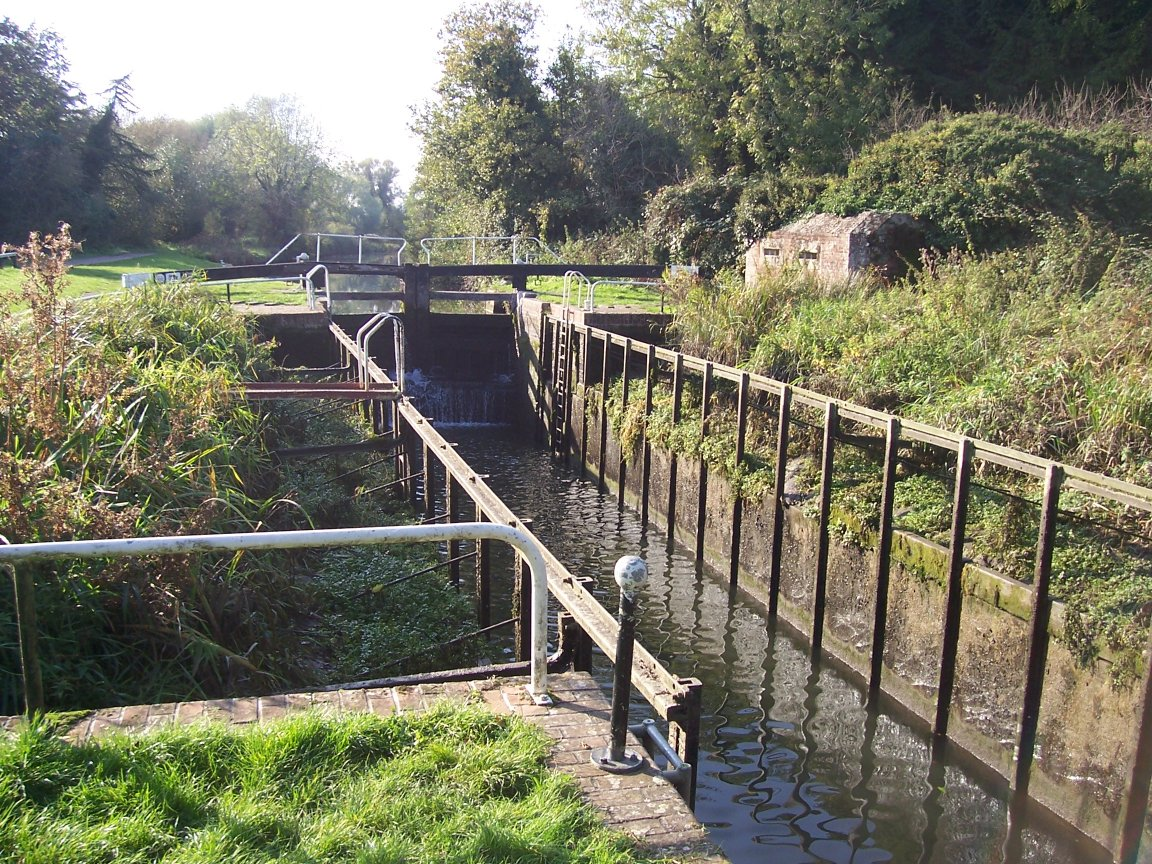
- The lock in 2007

- Location within Berkshire

General information
- Location: Near Reading, Berkshire, England
- Year built: 1718–23

Listed Building – Grade II*
- Official name: Garston Lock at SU 656708
- Designated: 6 December 1990
- Reference no.: 1117125

Garston Lock (grid reference SU655707) is a lock on the Kennet and Avon Canal. It is near the M4 motorway and near Reading, Berkshire, England.

Garston Lock was built between 1718 and 1723 under the supervision of the engineer John Hore of Newbury, and this stretch of the river is now administered by Canal & River Trust and known as the Kennet Navigation. It has a rise/fall of 7 feet 7 inches (2.31 m).

One of only two remaining working examples of turf-sided locks on the canal (the other being Monkey Marsh Lock in Thatcham, Berkshire), it needs "more water to operate than the now more common brick or stone-sided variety" as the sloping sides increase the volume of the lock.

The two sets of lock gates work differently: the upper set operates via a mechanical system, while the lower gates are hydraulic. The top part of the lock chamber has sloping banks which are covered by vegetation of various types rather than by turf. An arrangement of steel rails ensures that boats stay in the centre of the lock during the rise/fall.

In 1990 the lock was designated a Grade II* listed building.

Two pillboxes dating from World War II at the northwest and southeast corners of the lock, which were built as anti-tank defences, are also listed buildings.

== Gallery ==
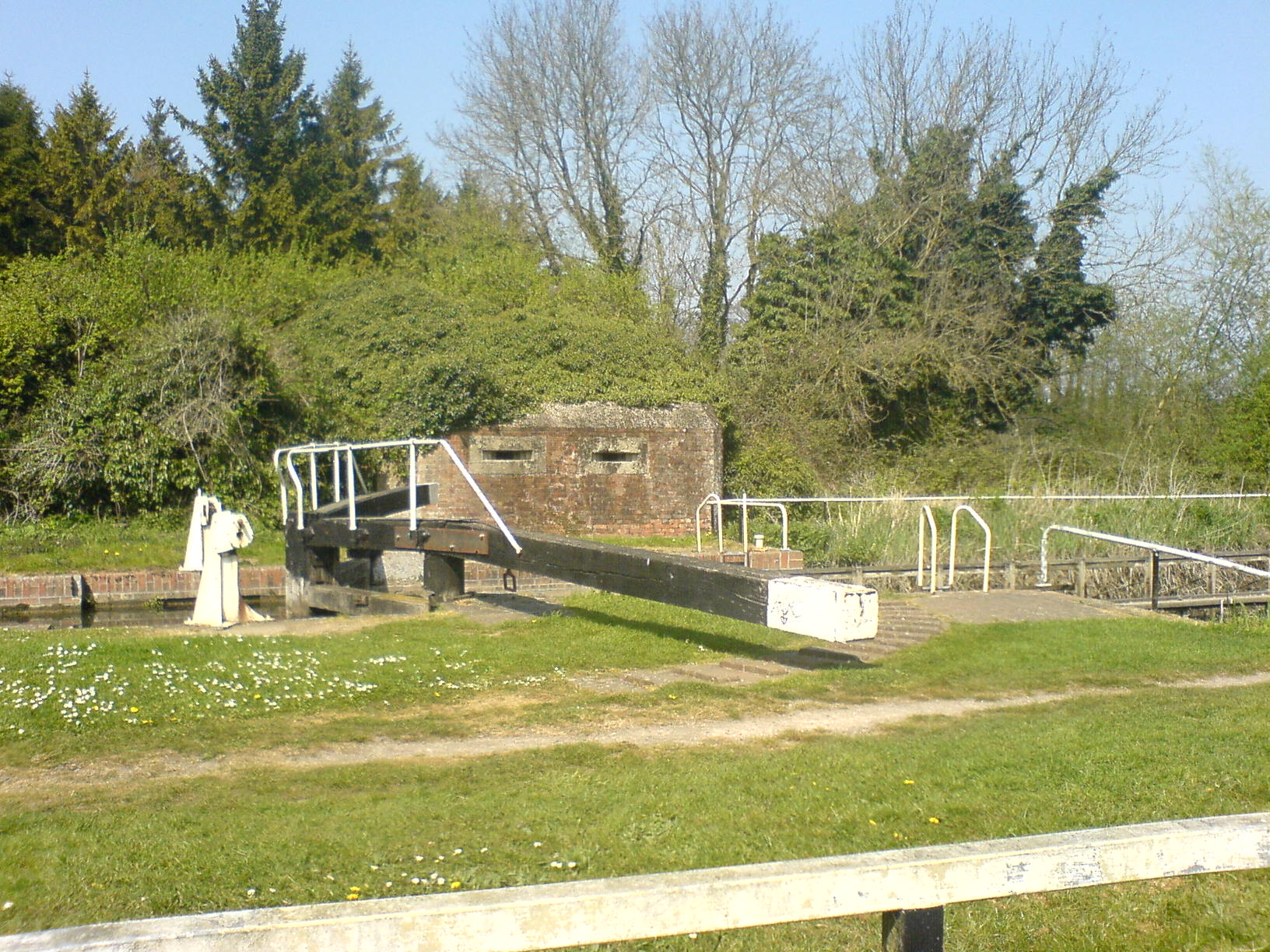
Pill box at Garston Lock

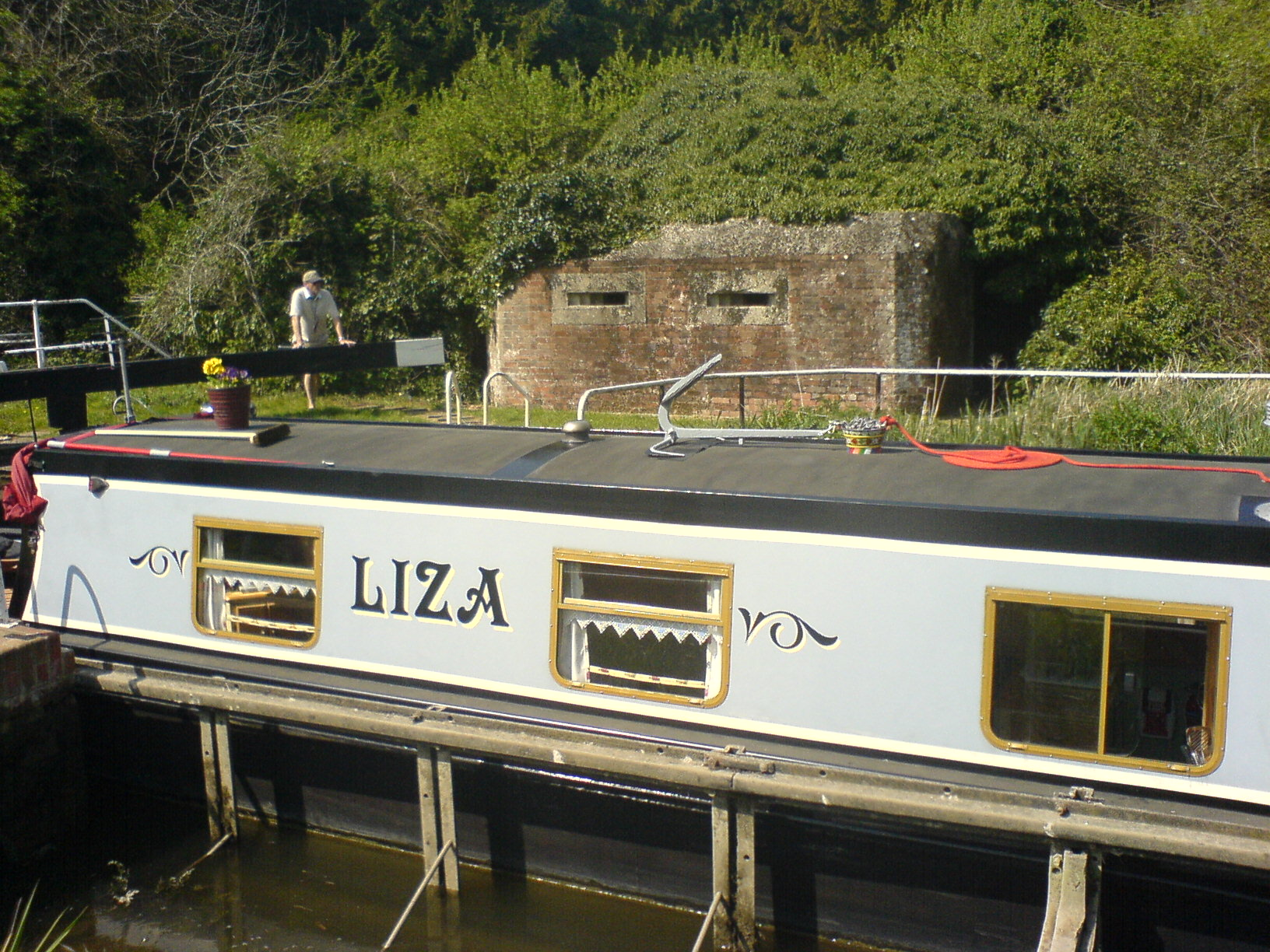
Canal boat next to pill box at Garston Lock

== See also ==
- Grade II* listed buildings in Berkshire
- Locks on the Kennet and Avon Canal

| Next lock upstream | River Kennet / Kennet and Avon Canal | Next lock downstream |
| Sheffield Lock | Garston Lock; Grid reference: SU655707 | Burghfield Lock |
