= Reading services =

Motorway service area in Berkshire, England

Reading Services
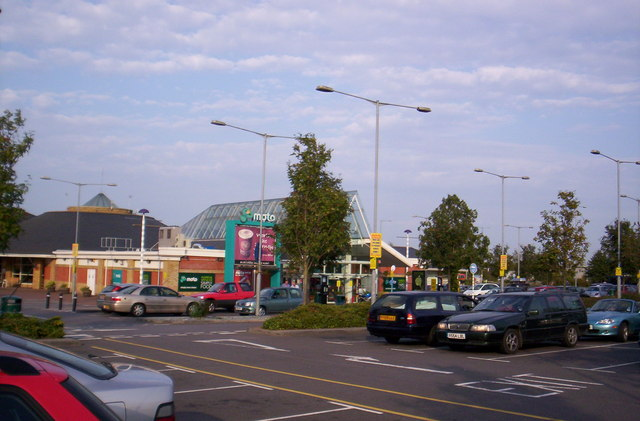
- Reading East services

- Location within Berkshire

Information
- County: Berkshire
- Road: M4
- Coordinates: 51.4245°N 1.0356°W
- Operator: Moto Hospitality
- Date opened: 1993
- Website: moto-way.com/services/reading-westbound/

Reading services comprises a pair of adjacent motorway service areas on the M4 motorway to the south of the town of Reading in the English county of Berkshire. The two areas are on opposite sides of the motorway, with Reading West services serving westbound traffic and Reading East services serving eastbound traffic.

Reading services are operated by Moto. Co-located with each of the two service areas is a Travelodge budget hotel. In 2021, consumer organisation Which? ranked Reading Services as second place on the M4, and 29th overall in the United Kingdom.

The services are within the civil parish of Burghfield. There is no direct vehicular or pedestrian link between the two service areas, whilst each area has its own access to the local road network that is gated and restricted to authorised vehicles.

Next eastbound: Heston services	Motorway service stations on the M4 motorway	Next westbound: Chieveley services
