= Blaze (dinghy) =

Class of dinghy

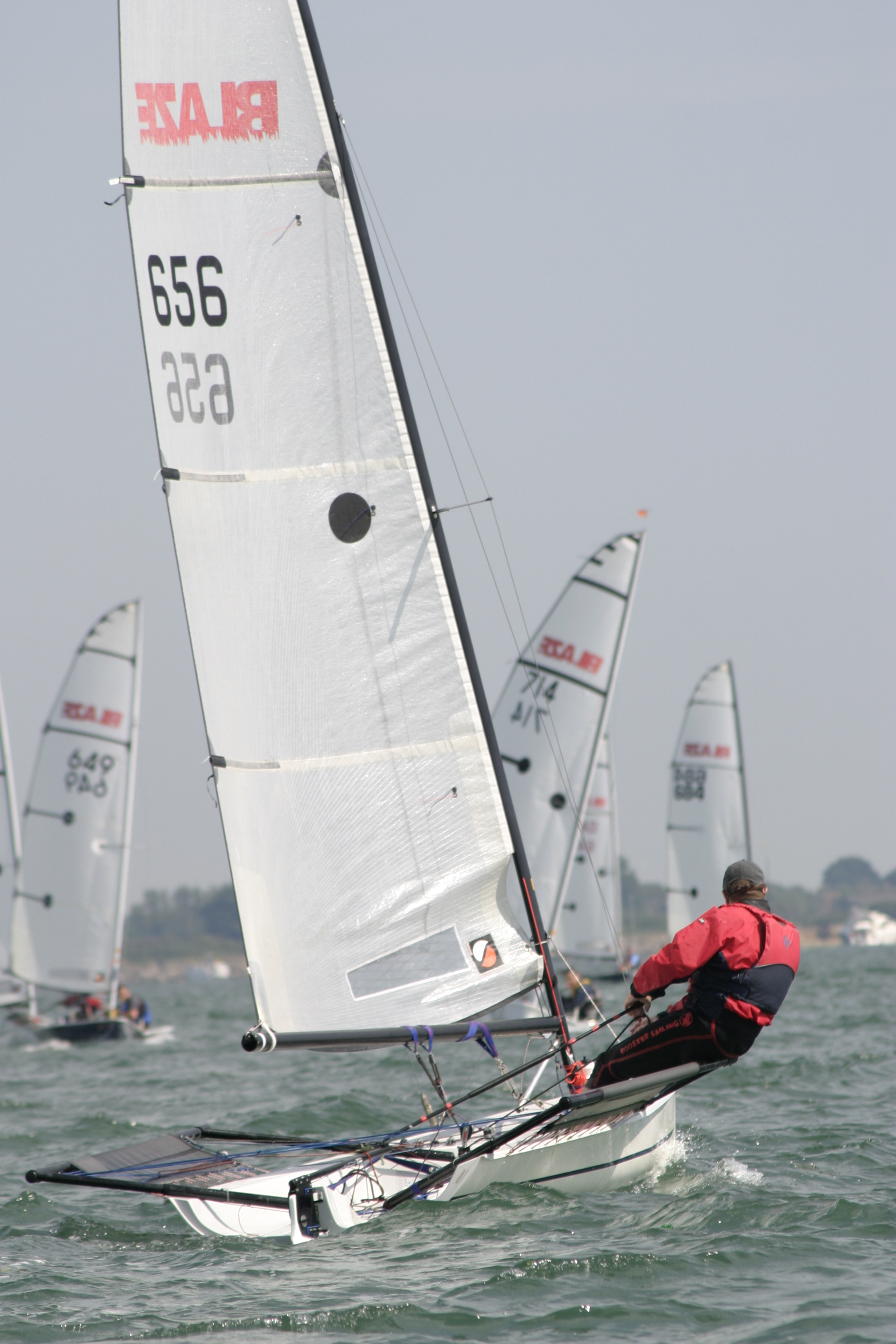
- Helmed by Paul Hemsley

Boat
- Crew: 1

Hull
- Hull weight: 72 kg
- LOA: 4.20 m (13.8 ft)
- Beam: 2.48 m (8 ft 2 in)

Rig
- Mast height: 6.5 m (21 ft)

Sails
- Mainsail area: 10.0 m^{2}

Racing
- RYA PN: 1032

The Blaze was designed in the mid-1990s by Ian Howlett, one time International 14 designer and associated with America's Cup design work and John Caig, winner of Fireball Worlds. It is a powerful winged single-hander with well-developed 10 m^{2} sail. Unusually in recent performance designs both foils are pivoting enabling the centreboard to be adjusted from the wing as well making it particularly suitable for estuaries and shallow lakes.

== Development ==
The Blaze was originally built by Ian Howlett and John Caig, and marketed by Topper International from 1996. At the outset the Blaze incorporated equalisation with lighter weight helms being allowed wider rack widths but carrying compensating lead weights. After a few years the class membership voted to abandon equalisation. In 2000 an active class association ran a sail development program to produce a more responsive sail, dropping some of the excessive leech of the original that proved 'difficult' in any real breeze for many helms. The slight loss in area was countered by a more efficient sail and balanced handling characteristics, and the class rapidly adopted the sail with numbers raced and sold rising very rapidly. In 2006 Topper moved out of performance composite boats and the manufacturing and marketing rights transferred to Cirrus Raceboats who have refined the boat further and work with Rondar to produce the current boat. As of November 2007 there are just under 250 registered boats.

Since 2012 White Formula have been producing the Blaze. White Formula were the original builders, building all Topper International boats.

== Area ==
The Blaze class is concentrated in the UK but there are boats in many other countries.
