= Burghfield Lock =

Canal lock in Burghfield, Berkshire, England

Coordinates: 51.43310°N 1.03182°W

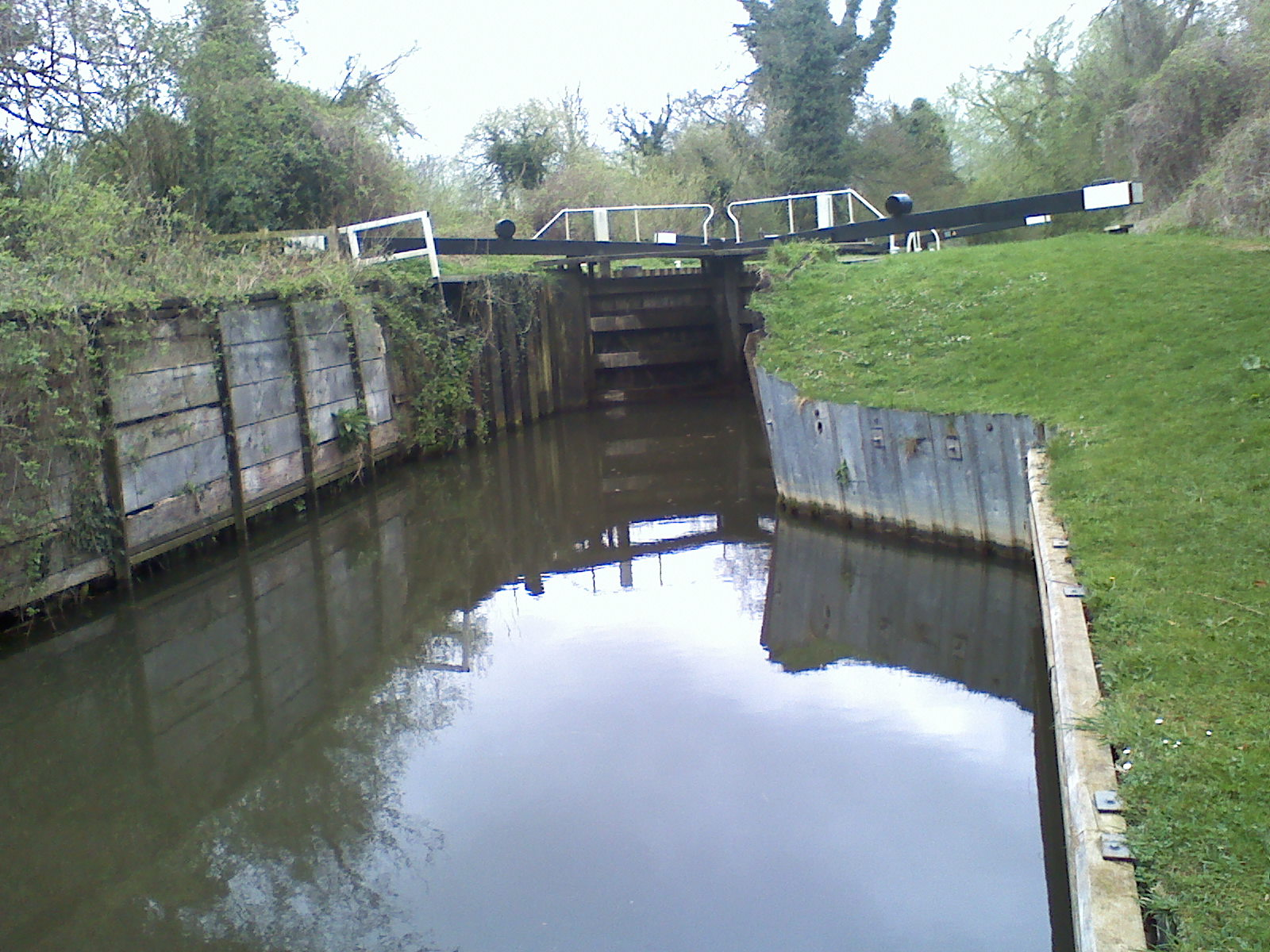
Burghfield Lock

Burghfield Lock is a lock on the River Kennet at Burghfield in the English county of Berkshire.

Burghfield Lock was built between 1718 and 1723 under the supervision of the engineer John Hore of Newbury, and this stretch of the river is now administered by the Canal & River Trust and known as the Kennet Navigation. It has a rise/fall of 7 ft 0 in (2.13 m).

The lock was restored in 1968 by a collaboration involving staff from British Waterways and volunteer labour.

== See also ==
- Locks on the Kennet and Avon Canal

Next lock upstream	River Kennet / Kennet and Avon Canal	Next lock downstream
Garston Lock	Burghfield Lock; Grid reference: SU674709	Southcote Lock
