= River Kennet =

Tributary of the River Thames in Southern England

Kennet
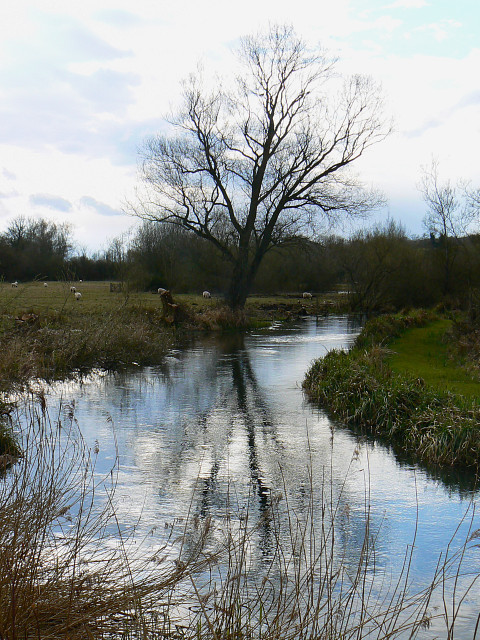
- The Kennet near Axford, Wiltshire

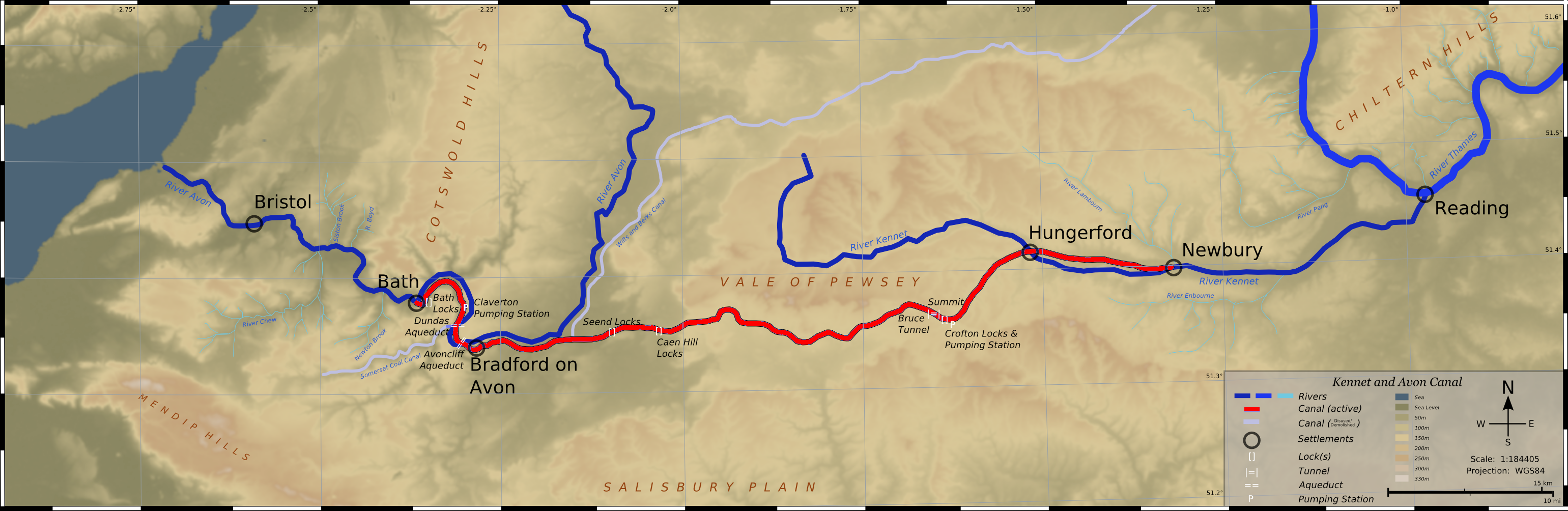
- The Avon of North Wiltshire and Somerset (to west, left) and the Kennet flowing into the Thames. Linking canal network in red.
- Etymology: Linked to place name: Cunetio (very likely from Celtic kūn, hound)

Location
- Country: England
- Counties: Wiltshire, Berkshire
- Towns: Marlborough, Hungerford, Newbury, Reading

Physical characteristics
- Source
  - location: Swallowhead Spring, near Silbury Hill, Wiltshire, United Kingdom
  - coordinates: 51.50276°N 1.84507°W
  - elevation: 200 m (660 ft)
- Mouth: River Thames
  - location: Reading, Berkshire, United Kingdom
  - coordinates: 51.459148°N 0.94947°W
  - elevation: 40 m (130 ft)
- Length: 72 km (45 mi)
- Discharge
  - location: Theale, Berkshire
  - average: 9.75 m^{3}/s (344 cu ft/s)
  - minimum: 0.93 m^{3}/s (33 cu ft/s)21 August 1976
  - maximum: 70.0 m^{3}/s (2,470 cu ft/s)11 June 1971
- Discharge
  - location: Newbury, Berkshire
  - average: 4.64 m^{3}/s (164 cu ft/s)
- Discharge
  - location: Knighton, Wiltshire
  - average: 2.50 m^{3}/s (88 cu ft/s)
- Discharge
  - location: Marlborough, Wiltshire
  - average: 0.85 m^{3}/s (30 cu ft/s)

Basin features
- Tributaries
  - left: River Og, River Lambourn
  - right: River Dun, River Enborne, Clayhill Brook, Foudry Brook
- Status: Largest tributary of outflow river

The Kennet is a chalk river and a tributary of the River Thames in Southern England. Most of the river is straddled by the North Wessex Downs National Landscape. The lower reaches have been made navigable as the Kennet Navigation, which – together with the Avon Navigation, the Kennet and Avon Canal and the Thames – links the cities of Bristol and London.

The length from near its sources west of Marlborough, Wiltshire down to Woolhampton, Berkshire is a 111.1-hectare (275-acre) biological Site of Special Scientific Interest (SSSI). This is primarily from an array of rare plants and animals completely endemic to chalky watercourses.

When Wiltshire had second-tier local authorities, one, Kennet District, took the name of the river.

== Etymology ==
The pronunciation (and spelling) was as the Kunnit (or Cunnit). This is likely derived from the Roman settlement in the upper valley floor, Cunetio (in the later large village of Mildenhall). Latin scholars state Cunetio is very unlikely to be a Latin derivation, meaning it is a Celtic British name, like most Roman town names in Britain. The frequent Celtic stem "cun-" means "hound", as in the modern Welsh ci, cŵn "dog". (Note: For more details see Wiktionary's Proto-Celtic kū.)

== Course ==
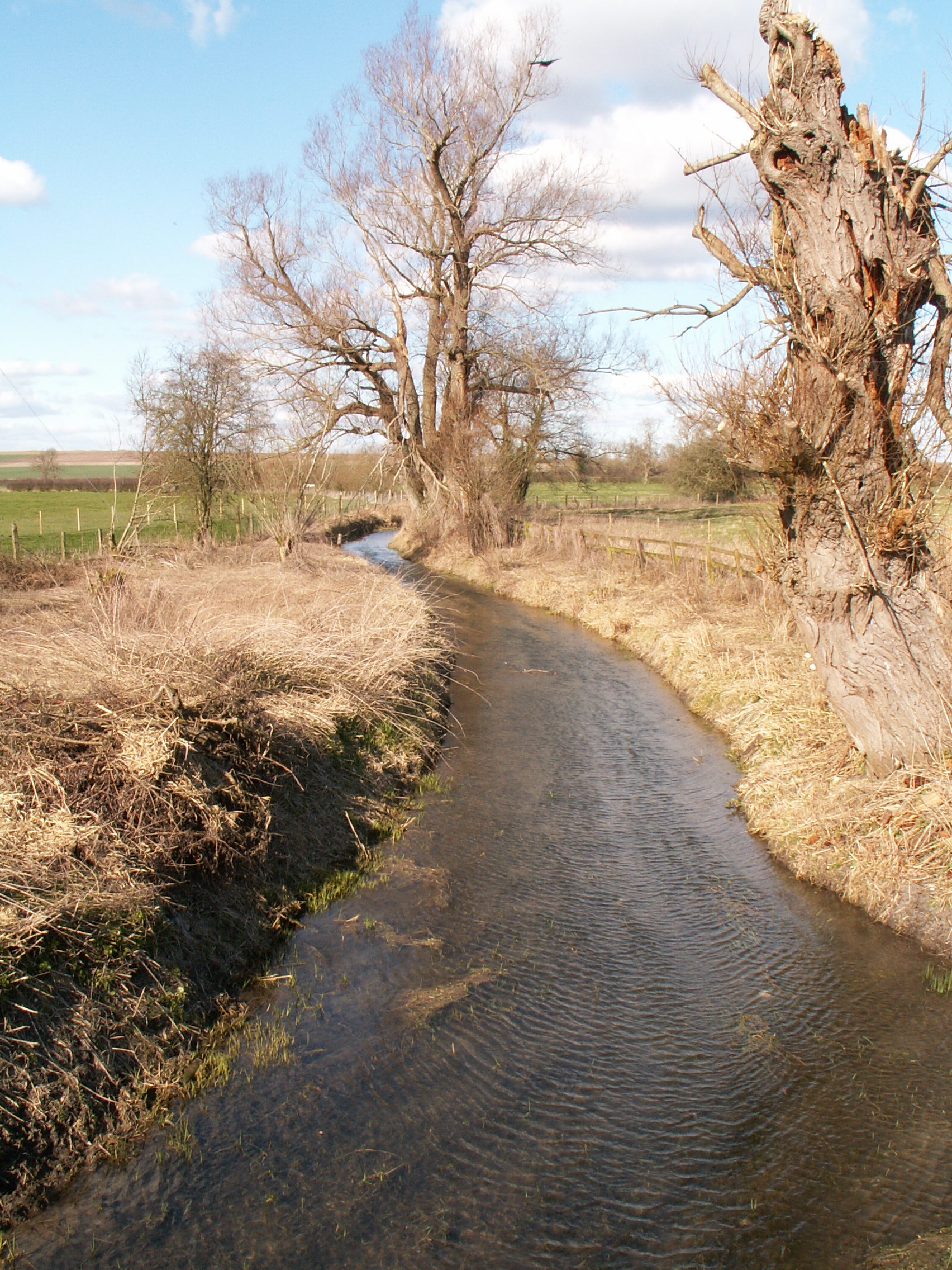
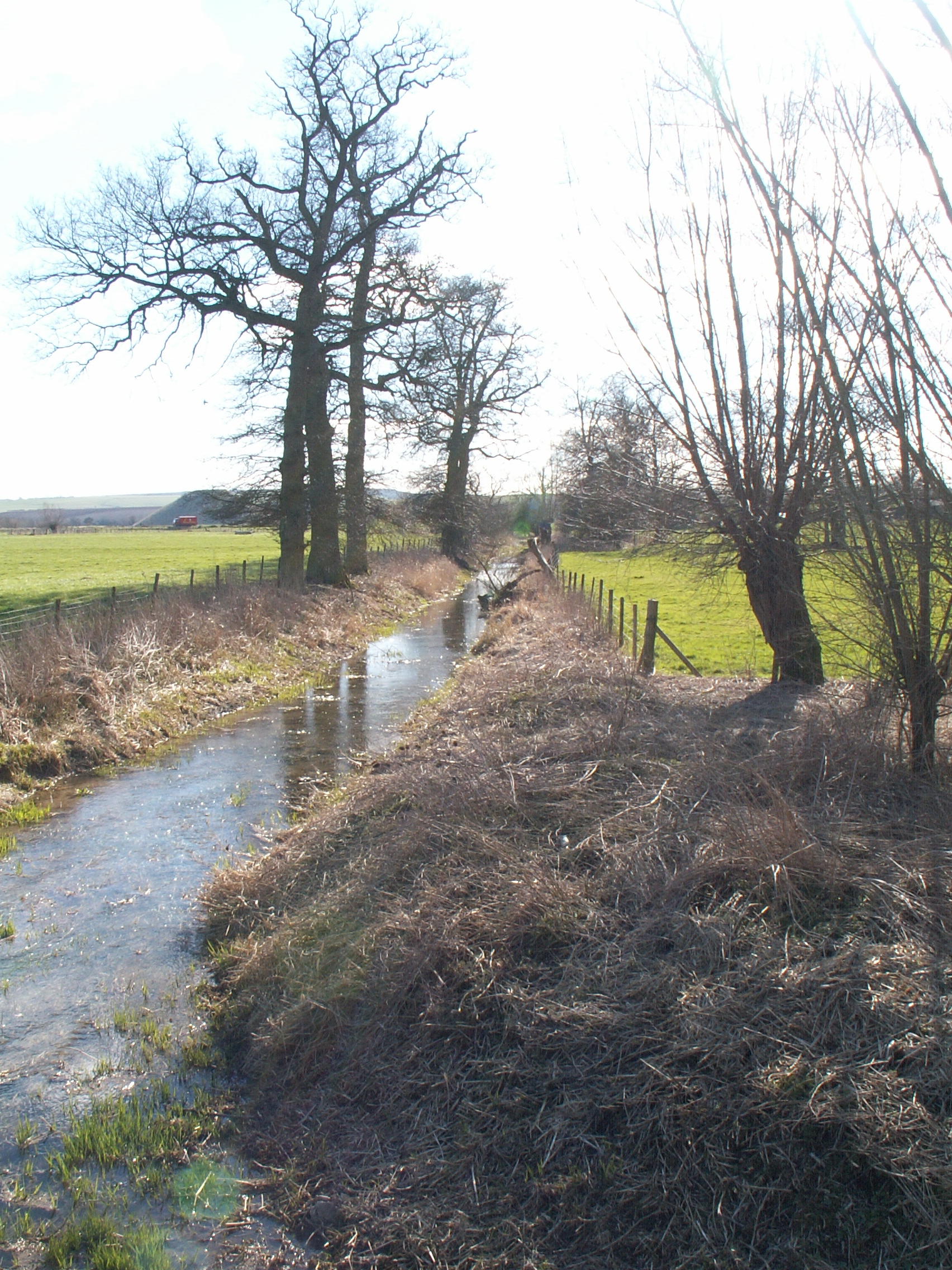
Two uppermost reaches of the River Kennet near Avebury, as a stream

One of the Kennet's sources is Swallowhead Spring near Silbury Hill in Wiltshire, and others are springs north of Avebury near the small villages of Uffcott and Broad Hinton. These then converge. In these early stages, the Kennet passes close by prehistoric sites, including Avebury Henge, West Kennet Long Barrow and Silbury Hill. The land drained by the headwaters normally has a deep water table (being in the North Wessex Downs which is mostly chalk as the upper subsoil), thus many stretches are winterbournes when and where precipitation is low and surrounding soils are not so dense with impermeables as to form a surface spring.

The river flows through the towns of Marlborough, Hungerford and Newbury before flowing into the Thames on the reach above Sonning Lock in central Reading, Berkshire.

The Og joins at Marlborough and the Dun enters at Hungerford, followed by the River Lambourn, Enborne and the Foudry Brook. For six miles (10 km) west of Reading's centre, the Kennet, being barraged to maintain its longest heads of water, has a semi-natural secondary channel (a long leat, a corollary), the Holy Brook. This powered the mills belonging to Reading Abbey.

== Navigation ==
Kennet Navigation Act 1715
- Act of Parliament
- Parliament of Great Britain
- Long title: An Act to make the River Kennet navigable, from Reading to Newbury, in the County of Berks.
- Citation: 1 Geo. 1. St. 2. c. 24
- Territorial extent: Great Britain

Dates
- Royal assent: 21 September 1715
- Commencement: 17 March 1715 (Note: Start of session.)
Other legislation
Amended by	River Kennet Navigation Act 1720; River Kennet Navigation Act 1729
Relates to	British Transport Commission Act 1956

Status: Amended

River Kennet Navigation Act 1720
- Act of Parliament
- Parliament of Great Britain
- Long title: An Act for enlarging the Time for making the River Kennet navigable, from Reading to Newbury, in the County of Berks.
- Citation: 7 Geo. 1. St. 1. c. 8
- Territorial extent: Great Britain

Dates
- Royal assent: 23 March 1721
- Commencement: 8 December 1720
Other legislation
Amends	Kennet Navigation Act 1715
Amended by	River Kennet Navigation Act 1729

Status: Amended

Text of statute as originally enacted

River Kennet Navigation Act 1729
- Act of Parliament
- Parliament of Great Britain
- Long title: An Act for making the Acts of the First and Seventh Years of His late Majesty's Reign, for making the River Kennet navigable, from Reading, to Newbury, in the County of Berks, more effectual.
- Citation: 3 Geo. 2. c. 35
- Territorial extent: Great Britain

Dates
- Royal assent: 15 May 1730
- Commencement: 13 January 1730
Other legislation
Amends	Kennet Navigation Act 1715; River Kennet Navigation Act 1720

Status: Current legislation

Text of statute as originally enacted

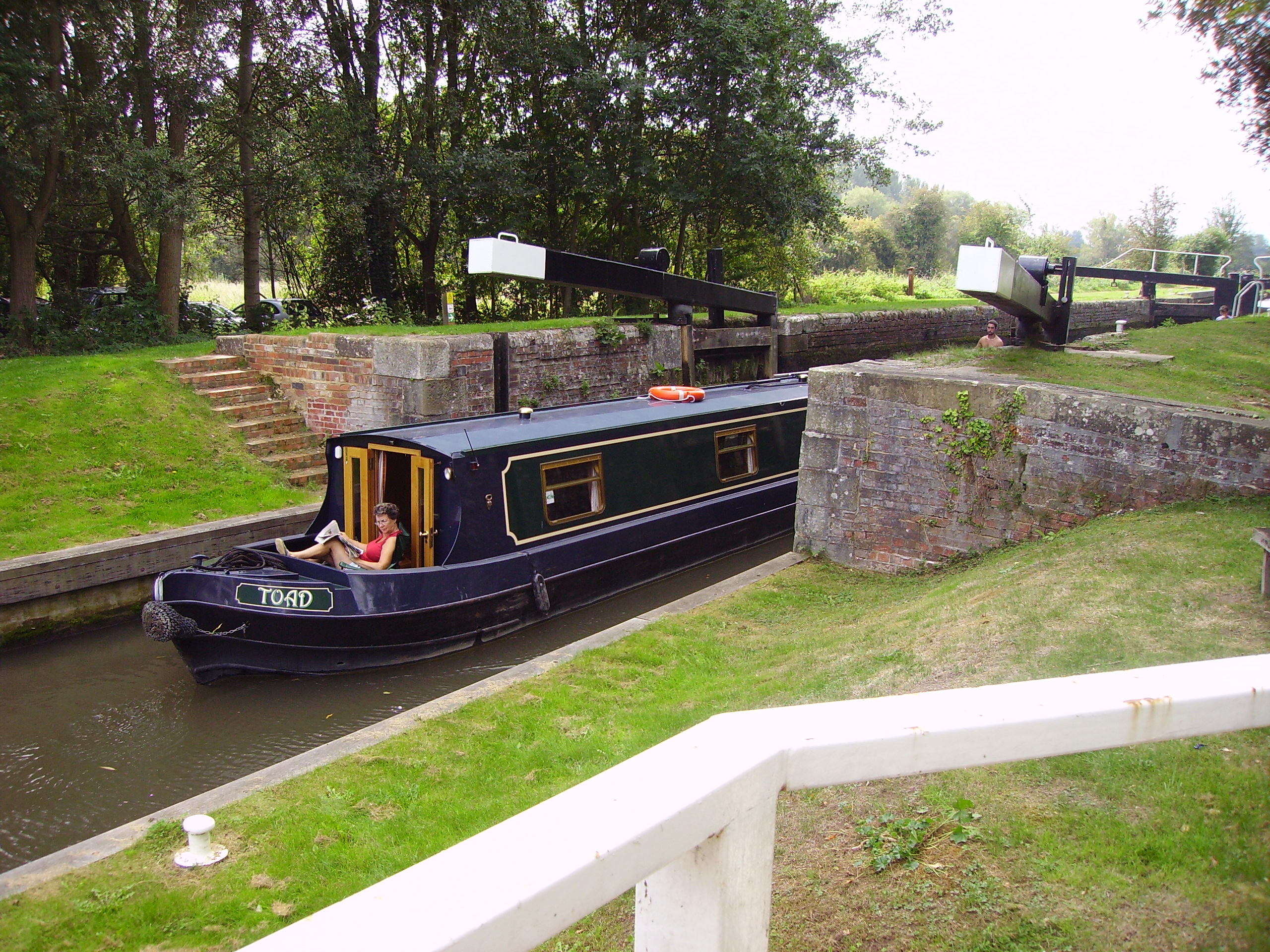
Tyle Mill Lock, Sulhamstead.

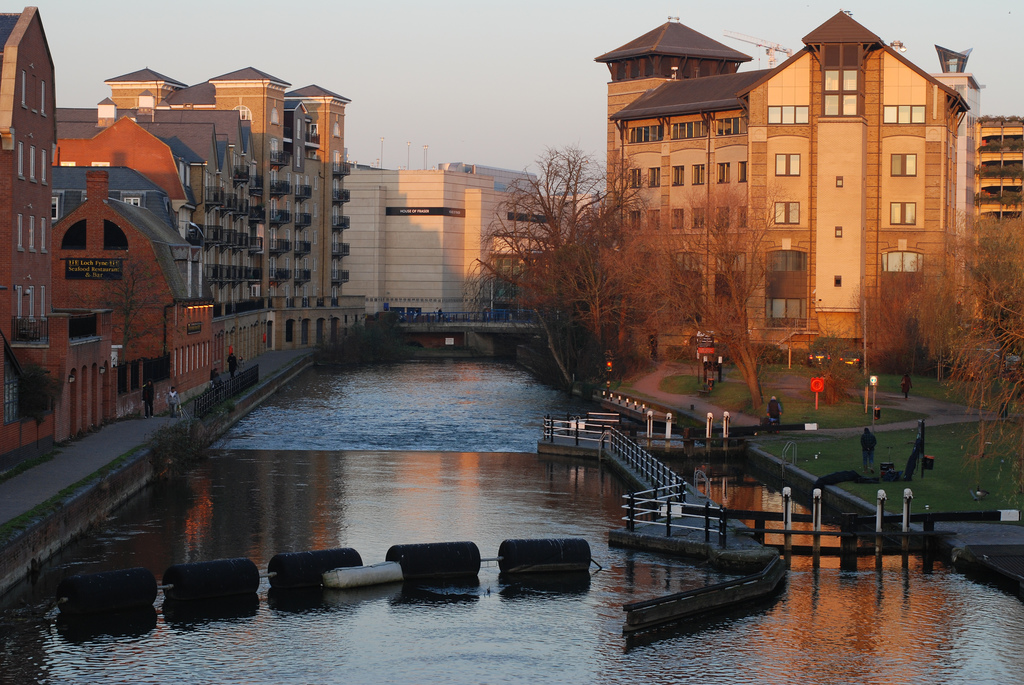
County Lock, Reading

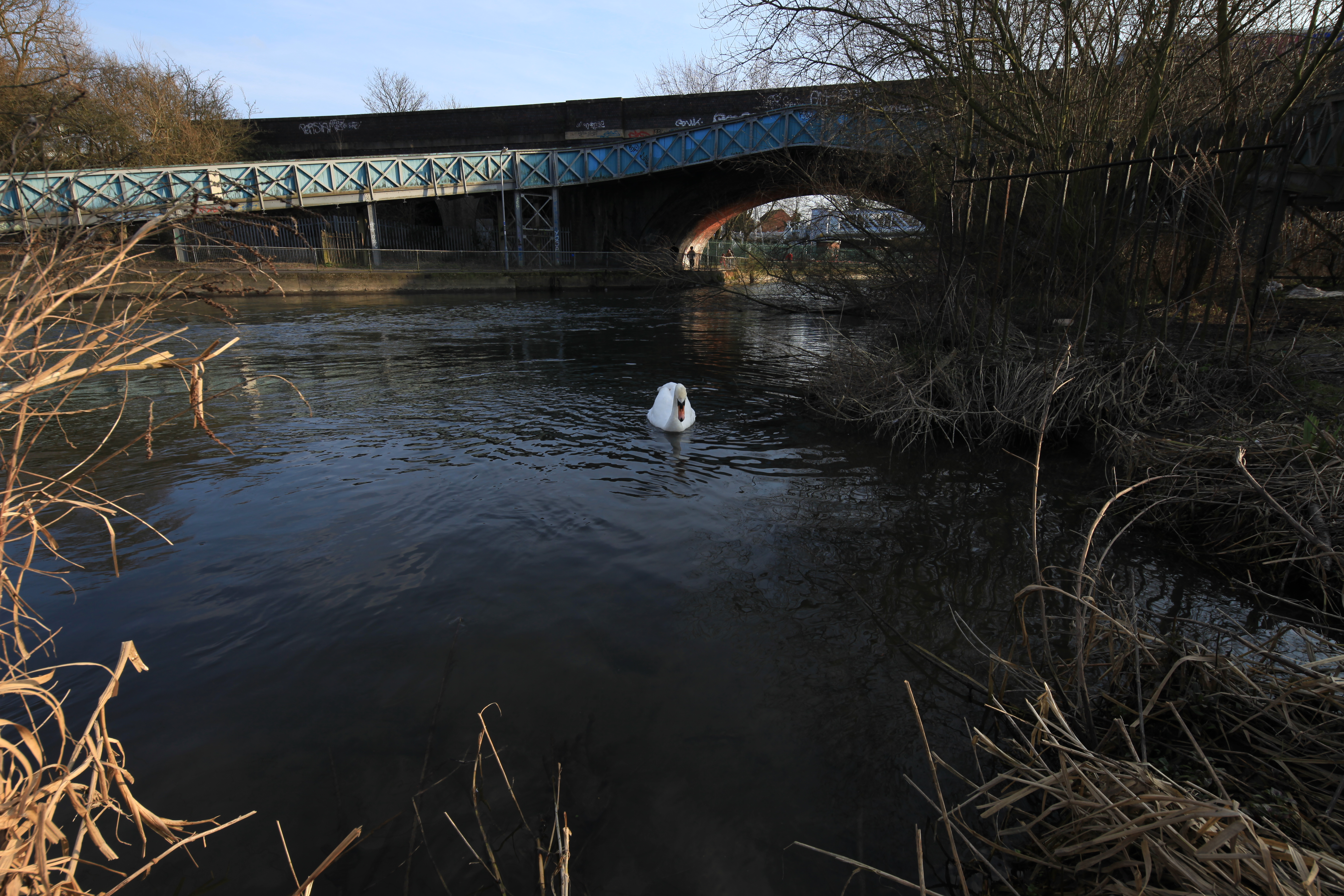
Kennet Mouth with bridge of the Great Western Railway by Brunel, Reading Kennet is navigable from the junction with the Thames at Kennet Mouth near Reading, upstream to Newbury where it joins the Kennet and Avon Canal.

The Horseshoe Bridge at Kennet Mouth, a timber-clad iron-truss structure, was built in 1891 as a way for horses towing barges along the Thames to cross the Kennet.

Going upstream, the first mile of the river, from Kennet Mouth to the High Bridge in Reading, has been navigable since at least the 13th century, providing wharfage for both the townspeople and Reading Abbey. Originally this short stretch of navigable river was under the control of the Abbey; today, including Blake's Lock, it is administered by the Environment Agency as if it were part of the River Thames.

From High Bridge through to Newbury, the river was made navigable between 1718 and 1723 under the supervision of the engineer John Hore of Newbury. Known as the Kennet Navigation, this stretch of the river is now administered by the Canal & River Trust as part of the Kennet and Avon Canal. Throughout the navigation, stretches of natural river bed alternate with 11 miles (18 km) of artificially created lock cuts, and a series of locks including County, Fobney, Southcote, Burghfield, Garston, Sheffield, Sulhamstead and Tyle Mill, to overcome a rise of 130 feet (40 m).

== Wildlife ==
The River Kennet is a haven for plants and animals. Its course takes it through the North Wessex Downs Area of Outstanding Natural Beauty, and the river between Marlborough and Woolhampton is designated a Site of Special Scientific Interest (SSSI). The protection that this status affords the Kennet means that endangered species of plants and animals can be found here. The white drifts of water crowfoot (Ranunculus) in early summer are characteristic of chalk and limestone rivers; there are superb displays by the footbridge at Chilton Foliat, and by the road bridge in Hungerford.

Animal species such as the water vole, grass snake, reed bunting, brown trout, and brook lamprey flourish here, despite being in decline in other parts of the country. Crayfish are very common in parts of the river. However, most, if not all, are now the alien American signal crayfish, having escaped from crayfish farms, which has replaced the native white-clawed crayfish in most southern rivers, although a small population still survives in the River Lambourn. Many hundreds of insect species can be found in and around the River Kennet. There are large hatches of mayflies, whose long-tailed, short-lived adults are a favourite food of trout; many species of water beetle and insect larvae. Caddisflies are also numerous, especially in the late summer. Alongside the river, the reed beds, grasses and other vegetation support other species, including the scarlet tiger moth, poplar hawk moths and privet hawks.

== Resource uses ==
Throughout its history, water mills on the Kennet have been a source of power for pre-industrial and industrial activities. In places the river has been built up to provide an additional head of water to drive the mills. Three mills remain in Ramsbury alone, and there are many disused or former mill sites, such as at Southcote, Burghfield, Sulhamstead, Aldermaston, Thatcham, Newbury, and Hungerford. Aside from the mills, in the 17th and 18th centuries the river water was also used for the brewing and tanning industries of Ramsbury and Marlborough.

== Water quality ==
The Environment Agency measures the water quality of the river systems in England. Each is given an overall ecological status, which may be one of five levels: high, good, moderate, poor and bad. There are several components that are used to determine this, including biological status, which looks at the quantity and varieties of invertebrates, angiosperms and fish. Chemical status, which compares the concentrations of various chemicals against known safe concentrations, is rated good or fail.

Water quality of the River Kennet in 2019:

Section	Ecological Status	Chemical Status	Overall Status	Length	Catchment	Channel
Upper Kennet to Marlborough	Moderate	Fail	Moderate	27.878 km (17.323 mi)	150.231 km^{2} (58.005 sq mi)	
Middle Kennet (Marlborough to Hungerford)	Good	Fail	Moderate	34.037 km (21.150 mi)	57.123 km^{2} (22.055 sq mi)	
Middle Kennet (Hungerford to Newbury)	Moderate	Fail	Moderate	49.227 km (30.588 mi)	84.872 km^{2} (32.769 sq mi)	
Kennet (Lambourn confluence to Enborne confluence)	Moderate	Fail	Moderate	16.626 km (10.331 mi)	38.254 km^{2} (14.770 sq mi)	
Lower Kennet (Sheffield Bottom to Reading)	Moderate	Fail	Moderate	29.791 km (18.511 mi)	48.887 km^{2} (18.875 sq mi)	

=== Insect kill of July 2013 ===
In July 2013 the Environment Agency investigated an insect kill which resulted when a small quantity (estimated to be two teaspoonfuls (10 millilitres)), of chlorpyrifos, an organophosphate insecticide used in ant poison and available in garden centres, was flushed into the river killing the freshwater shrimp and most other arthropods on the stretch of the river between Marlborough and Hungerford. The dead insects sank to the bottom of the river and rotted, resulting in a bad smell, but no fish seemed to have been killed. However, without insects and shrimps to feed on, many of the fish, birds and amphibians that use the river would be likely to fade away and die. The poison was diluted and removed by the flow of the stream.

== See also ==
- Tributaries of the River Thames
- List of rivers of England
- List of locks on the Kennet and Avon Canal

== Notes ==
Next confluence upstream	River Thames	Next confluence downstream
River Pang (south)	River Kennet	Berry Brook (north)
