= Burghfield Common =

Coordinates: 51.3970°N 1.0677°W

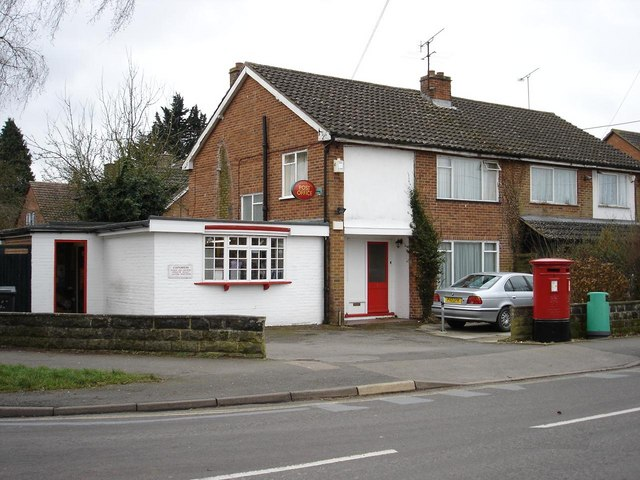
- The Post Office

- Location within Berkshire
- Area: 1.686 km^{2} (0.651 sq mi)
- Population: 6,415 (2024 estimate)
  - Density: 3,805/km^{2} (9,850/sq mi)
- Civil parish: Burghfield
- Unitary authority: West Berkshire
- Ceremonial county: Berkshire
- Region: South East
- Country: England
- Sovereign state: United Kingdom
- Police: Thames Valley
- Fire: Royal Berkshire
- Ambulance: South Central

Burghfield Common is a village in the civil parish of Burghfield, in the West Berkshire district, in the ceremonial county of Berkshire, England. In 2024 it had an estimated population of 6415. The village is located among several villages and hamlets these being Mortimer Common, Burghfield, Burghfield Hill, Sheffield Bottom, Sulhampstead Abbots and Stratfield Mortimer. The closest towns are Reading and Tadley.

Burghfield Common is largely a mid to late 20th–century settlement. It is served by Reading Buses services 2/2a from Central Reading.
