= Bloomfield Hatch =

Coordinates: 51°23′11″N 1°00′52″W

- Hamlet
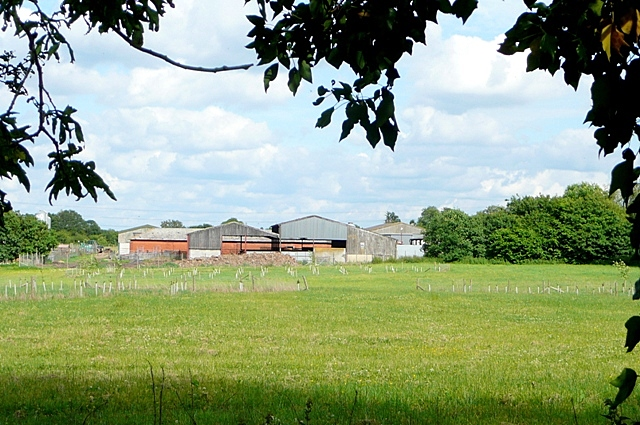
- Bloomfield Hatch Farm

- Location within Berkshire
- OS grid reference: SU686657
- Unitary authority: West Berkshire
- Ceremonial county: Berkshire
- Region: South East
- Country: England
- Sovereign state: United Kingdom
- Post town: READING
- Postcode district: RG7
- Dialling code: 0118
- Police: Thames Valley
- Fire: Royal Berkshire
- Ambulance: South Central
- UK Parliament: Berkshire

Bloomfield Hatch is a hamlet in Berkshire, England, and part of the civil parish of Wokefield . The settlement lies near the villages of Stratfield Mortimer and Beech Hill, and is located approximately 5 miles (8.0 km) south-east of Reading. It is located immediately to the East of Wokefield Park. Bloomfield Hatch Farm lies in the centre of the hamlet.
