= West End Brook =

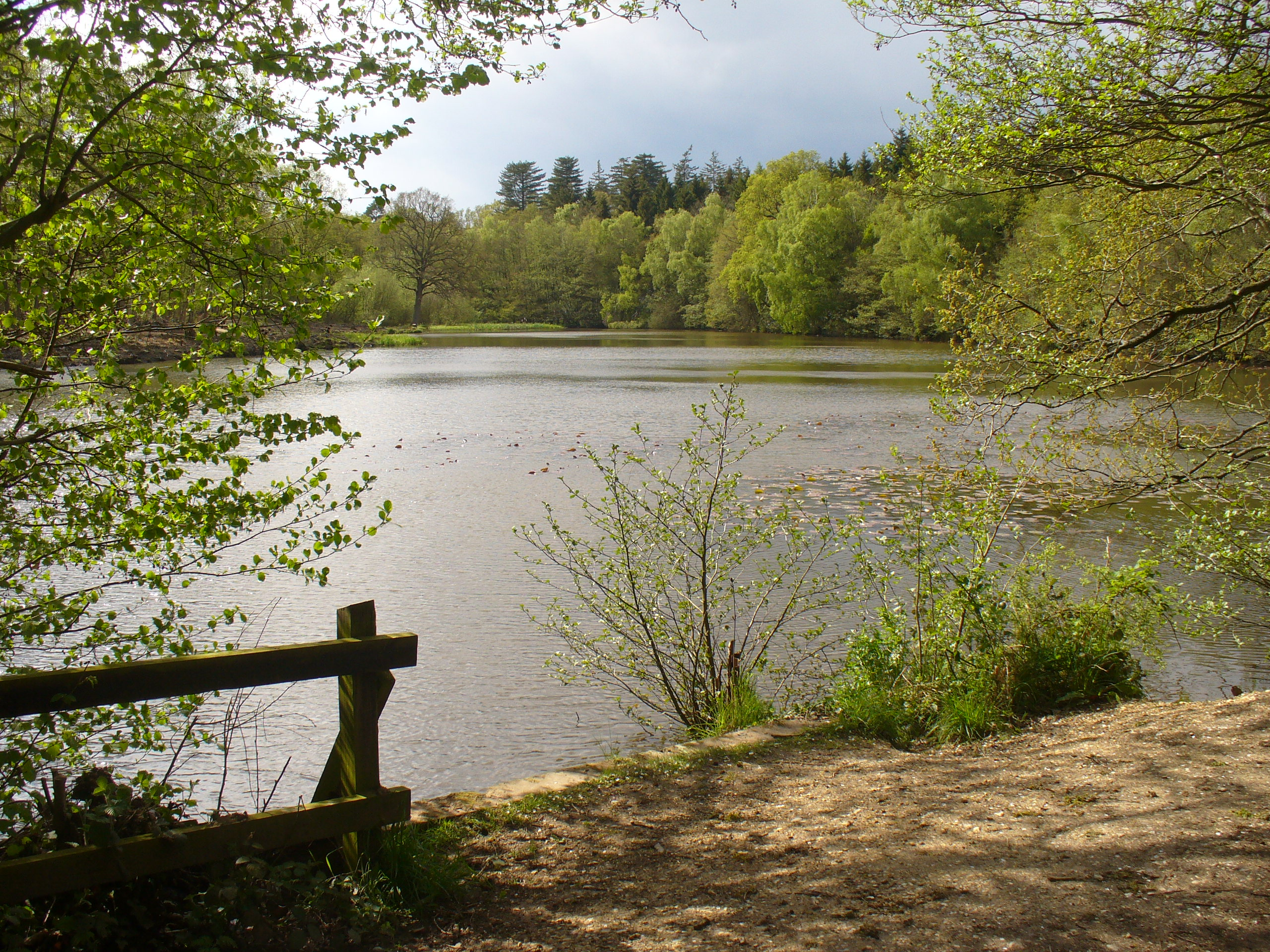
- West End Brook at Kiln Pond, Benyon's Inclosure, Hampshire.

Location
- Country: England
- Counties: , Hampshire
- Towns: Tadley, Mortimer West End

Physical characteristics
- Source: Tadley
  - location: Hampshire, United Kingdom
  - coordinates: 51°21′36″N 1°08′43″W
  - elevation: 103 m (338 ft)
- Mouth: Foudry Brook
  - location: Hampshire, United Kingdom
  - coordinates: 51°21′44″N 1°03′11″W
  - elevation: 59 m (194 ft)
- Discharge
  - location: Foudry Brook, south of Mortimer Common, Berkshire

West End Brook is a small stream in southern England. It rises near the Hampshire village of Tadley. Its name is probably related to the parish, and village, it passes through for some of its course: Mortimer West End.

== Route ==
The source of West End Brook is from springs near Strawberry Farm, to the north of Tadley and south of the Atomic Weapons Establishment at the former airfield of RAF Aldermaston. The springs are just above the 330-foot (100 m) contour, to the north of the Hampshire county boundary in Berkshire, and very close to West's Meadow, Aldermaston Site of Special Scientific Interest (SSSI), 2.96 acres (1.20 ha) of unimproved meadows which are unusual, as the well-drained sandy soils remain damp, probably due to a layer of clay material beneath them. The meadows provide habitat for over 80 species of grassland plants, which for a small meadow is quite a high number. The stream travels east in a wooded corridor, passing through Upper Moor's Gulley to the south of AWE Aldermaston. A tributary joins the stream on its left bank, flowing south from Decoy Pond, a large pond within the AWE site. This particular area, identified on maps as Roundwood Copse, is also an SSSI, known as Decoy Pit, Pools and Woods, which covers an area of 50.08 acres (20.27 ha) and consists of multiple habitats, including grassland, heathland, woodland and small waterbodies. It is notable because it contains more species of breeding dragonfly and damselfly than anywhere else in Berkshire, and also includes rare Alder woodland.

Further east the stream is joined by another small stream on its right bank, rising from springs in Roundwood Gulley, and passes under Soke Road, which at that point briefly follows the course of a Roman road. It also crosses the county boundary into Hampshire at this location. The river continues through the woodland of Benyon's Inclosure, and enters Kiln Pond. An embankment carries a track over the pond, dividing it into two. In 1872, both ponds were fish ponds, but by 1896, only the lower pond, covering an area of 1.637 acres (0.662 ha), was used for this purpose, and the upper pond, covering 1.717 acres (0.695 ha), was marshy ground. By 1969, the upper area was again a pond, covering 4.72 acres (1.91 ha), and there were three sluices to allow water to pass through the embankment, with another sluice controlling the outflow from the lower pond. Just to the south of the pond is The Frith, an Iron Age Hill fort, where a single line of earthworks, which are quite modest in scale, enclose the top of a hill. The enclosure is 520 feet (160 m) by 390 feet (120 m) and there are no records of archaeological excavation being carried out on the site, although parts of it near its entrance have been damaged by tree planting. Silchester Roman Town is located around 0.6 miles (1 km) to the south-east, and the fort may have been associated with the Iron Age town that pre-dated the Roman one.

A stream flowing from two springs on Benyon's Inclosure joins on the left bank as it passes under Church Road, at which point it has already descended to 240 feet (73 m) Above Ordnance Datum (AOD). The course of another Roman road crosses at Lovegrove's Farm and it is joined by another stream, draining from Hundred Acre Piece, a large area of woodland to the north. It passes under Turk's Lane, and as it turns to the south, it forms the county boundary between Hampshire and Berkshire. After passing through Tanhouse Bridge, carrying Pitfield Lane over the river, it joins Foudry Brook on its left bank.

== Water quality ==
The Environment Agency measure water quality of the river systems in England. Each is given an overall ecological status, which may be one of five levels: high, good, moderate, poor and bad. There are several components that are used to determine this, including biological status, which looks at the quantity and varieties of invertebrates, angiosperms and fish. Chemical status, which compares the concentrations of various chemicals against known safe concentrations, is rated good or fail.

The water quality of West End Brook was as follows in 2019.

Section	Ecological Status	Chemical Status	Overall Status	Length	Catchment
West End Brook (tributary of Foudry Brook)	Poor	Fail	Poor	1.1 miles (1.8 km)	4.27 square miles (11.1 km^{2})

Water quality on West End Brook dropped from moderate to bad in 2015, and the reasons for it not being good are mainly to do with physical modification of the channel, which prevents fish freely moving around the system, and the presence of the invasive species, the North American signal crayfish.
