= Wokefield =

Coordinates: 51°23′39″N 1°01′33″W

- Hamlet and civil parish
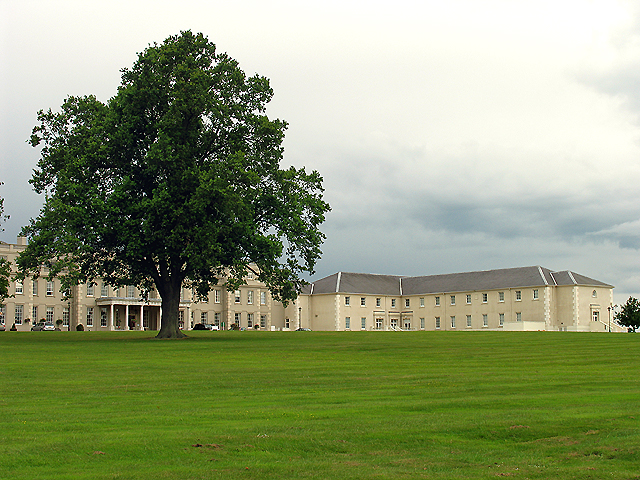
- Wokefield Park

- Location within Berkshire
- Population: 416 (2011 Census)
- OS grid reference: SU677660
- Unitary authority: West Berkshire
- Ceremonial county: Berkshire
- Region: South East
- Country: England
- Sovereign state: United Kingdom
- Post town: READING
- Postcode district: RG7
- Dialling code: 0118
- Police: Thames Valley
- Fire: Royal Berkshire
- Ambulance: South Central
- UK Parliament: Berkshire

Wokefield is a hamlet and civil parish in the West Berkshire district of Berkshire, England, south of Reading. The parish includes the hamlets of Goddard's Green and Bloomfield Hatch. It also includes part of the former parish of Sulhamstead and Grazeley.

== Geography ==
To the north of the parish are Burghfield and Burghfield Common, to the east is Shinfield, and to the south are Stratfield Mortimer and Mortimer Common. It lies between 40 m (130 ft) and 95 m (312 ft) above sea level.

== Wokefield Common ==
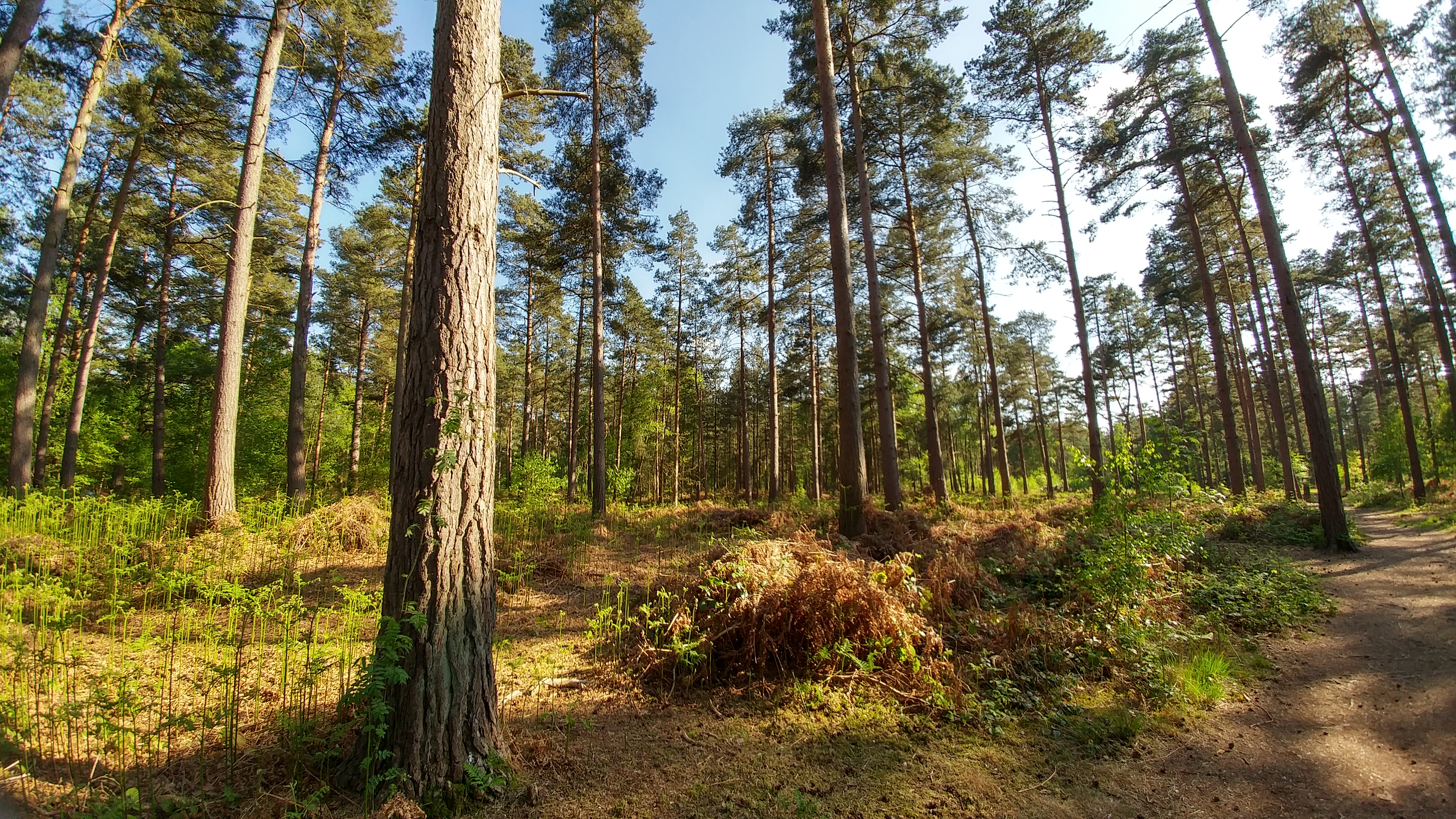
Wokefield Common - Pine Forest May 2017

Wokefield Common is an area of mixed woodland on the northern border of the parish. It has been declared a Wildlife Heritage Site by West Berkshire Council's Countryside Service, and is described as a quiet site with a network of paths leading through tall pine and broadleaf woodland, ponds, small areas of heather and rich wet gullies. Of particular significance are the heathland areas which support rare species including slowworms, grass snakes and adders. The 60-hectare (0.60 km^{2}) site is jointly managed by the Countryside Service, the landowner and Berkshire, Buckinghamshire and Oxfordshire Wildlife Trust. The main entrance is on Goring Lane on the outskirts of Burghfield. Several public bridleways and public footpaths cross the common. There are several smaller woods and coppices, including Pitchkettle Wood, Rookery Wood, Bell Copse and Pond Wood. Much of the rest of the parish is agricultural and there are several farms in the parish.

== Watercourses ==
Burghfield Brook lies at the northern border of Wokefield Common. A feature of this watercourse is Pullens Pond, formed where the brook is dammed by a forest access road within the common. To the east of this area the brook continues into a small valley, Burghfield Slade, which contains a larger reservoir. It then continues to the northeast, leaving the parish, and feeds into Foudry Brook. Lockram Brook runs northeast through the parish via Millbarn Pond, joining Burghfield Brook near Grazeley Green.

== Wokefield Park ==
The 18th-century mansion of Wokefield Park was the home of Alfred Palmer in the late 19th and early 20th centuries. It later served as St Benedict's School before becoming a community home. It is now a hotel and conference centre with its own golf course. The building is a Grade II* listed building.
