= Burghfield Brook =

Stream in Berkshire, England

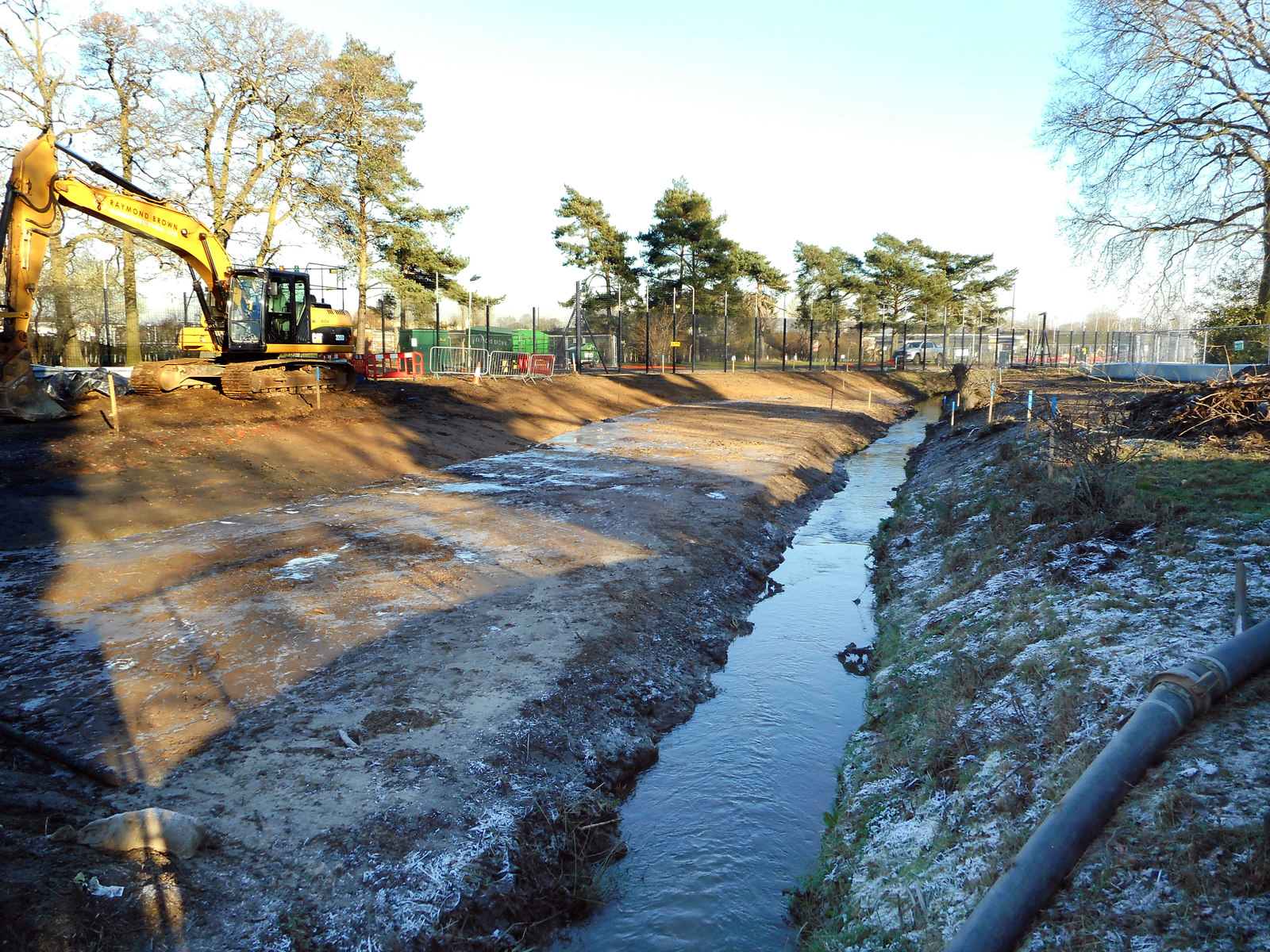
- A new channel being constructed for Burghfield Brook around the edge of AWE Burghfield in 2017

Location
- Country: England
- Counties: Berkshire
- Districts / Boroughs: Wokefield Parish, Burghfield Parish
- Villages: Burghfield Common, Mortimer Common

Physical characteristics
- Source
  - location: Wokefield Common
  - coordinates: 51.3935°N 1.0632°W
  - elevation: 95 m (312 ft)
- Mouth: Foudry Brook
  - location: Grazeley Green
  - coordinates: 51.4171°N 0.9948°W
  - elevation: 40 m (130 ft)

Basin features
- Tributaries
  - left: The Teg
  - right: Lockram Brook

Burghfield Brook is a small stream in southern England. It rises in Wokefield Common between the Berkshire villages of Mortimer and Burghfield Common. It is a tributary of Foudry Brook, which it joins near Hartley Court Farm, just to the south of the M4 motorway.

== Route ==
Burghfield Brook rises from a series of springs on Wokefield Common, near the end of Bunces Lane. The emergent brook heads eastwards along the northern edge of Wokefield Common, passing through two small lakes and into a small valley called Burghfield Slade, to reach a reservoir of water to the south of Auclum Copse. The brook marks the border between Burghfield to the north and Wokefield to the south. A second source issues from the ground to the south-west of the springs, and flows eastwards across the common to Pullen's Pond, a small fish pond. On the edge of the heathland area it briefly disappears to re-emerge at the edge of Burghfield Slade, and empties into the reservoir. A third brook rises on Auclum Copse and flows southwards to reach the reservoir. 150 acres (60 ha) of Wokefield Common are managed as a nature reserve by the Berkshire, Buckinghamshire and Oxfordshire Wildlife Trust, where the woodland is regularly thinned to preserve the heathland environment. Pullen's Pond and Dragonfly Pond provide habitat for a number of dragonfly and damselfly species.

The outflow from the reservoir passes under Man's Hill, after which there is a sluice, with Culverlands Farm on its northern bank and Goddards Green to the south. It turns to the north-east, and at James's Farm in Grazeley Green it is joined by Lockram Brook, which has run parallel to Burghfield Brook for most of its length, but a little further to the south. It continues to act as the parish boundary as it turns to the north, until it reaches James's Lane and the southern edge of the Atomic Weapons Establishment, Burghfield. It used to continue in a large curve, passing Saunderscourt Farm, where the parish boundary ceased to follow the brook, before turning to the east to reach the junction between Rider's Lane, Burnthouse Lane and Fuller's Lane. The bridge was called Gravelly Bridge in 1877, but had become Burnthouse Bridge by 1899.

In 1938 the Ministry of Defence requisitioned 225 acres (91 ha) of farmland from the Burghfield Place Farm Estate, on which to build a Royal Ordnance Factory. ROF Burghfield was a filling factory, used for the storage and deployment of armaments, and was served by a siding from the Reading to Basingstoke railway. In 1954, the site changed hands, becoming part of the Atomic Weapons Establishment, and was responsible for the assembly of Blue Steel nuclear missiles, which became operational in 1961. The site still assembles, maintains and decommissions Britain's nuclear weapons. At some point, prior to 1972, the brook was diverted along the southern boundary of ROF Burghfield, and then follows its eastern boundary to rejoin the original course at Burnthouse Bridge. The precise date when the brook was diverted is not easy to ascertain, for maps prior to 1972 show the pre-1938 layout, as if the factory did not exist. From the bridge it heads eastwards, passing under the Reading to Basingstoke railway embankment, where it is joined by a tributary, which rises near the Wokefield Park conference and training centre. Beyond the junction, it heads northwards, is joined by The Teg on its left bank, a tributary which has flowed northwards and then eastwards from Burghfield, passing to the north of ROF Burghfield, and joins Foudry Brook immediately after passing under Kybes Lane.

The watercourse near James's Farm is particularly liable to flooding and has been the subject of discussion at West Berkshire Council meetings.

== Water Quality ==
The Environment Agency measure water quality of the river systems in England. Each is given an overall ecological status, which may be one of five levels: high, good, moderate, poor and bad. There are several components that are used to determine this, including biological status, which looks at the quantity and varieties of invertebrates, angiosperms and fish. Chemical status, which compares the concentrations of various chemicals against known safe concentrations, is rated good or fail.

The water quality of the Burghfield Brook was as follows in 2019.

Section	Ecological Status	Chemical Status	Overall Status	Length	Catchment
Burghfield Brook	Moderate	Fail	Moderate	4.2 miles (6.8 km)	7.02 square miles (18.2 km^{2})

The main reason for the water quality being less than good is that the brook is affected by discharges from industry.

== Bibliography ==
- Atkins (May 2007). "AWE Aldermaston, Burghfield and Blacknest Historic Characterisation and Management Strategy" (PDF). www.nuclearinfo.org. Archived (PDF) from the original on 20 July 2020.
