= Lockram Brook =

Stream in Berkshire, England

Location
- Country: England
- Counties: Berkshire
- Districts / Boroughs: Wokefield Parish, Burghfield Parish
- Villages: Mortimer

Physical characteristics
- Source
  - location: Mortimer, Berkshire
  - coordinates: 51.379626°N 1.069155°W
- Mouth: Burghfield Brook
  - location: Grazeley Green, Berkshire
  - coordinates: 51.3994°N 1.0317°W
  - elevation: 40 m (130 ft)
- Discharge
  - location: Foudry Brook

Lockram Brook is a small stream in southern England. It rises near the Berkshire village of Mortimer, and is a tributary of Burghfield Brook.

== Route ==
Lockram Brook rises in various areas of woodland and farmland near Mortimer. These include drains in Brocas Plantation, to the west of Reading Road, and springs on Wokefield Common and in Starvale Woods further east. 150 acres (60 ha) of Wokefield Common are managed as a nature reserve by the Berkshire, Buckinghamshire and Oxfordshire Wildlife Trust, where the woodland is regularly thinned to preserve the heathland environment. A separate branch begins at springs on Long Moor, a little further to the south, which join up before passing under Loogmoor Road. More springs flow northwards from Lukin's Wood, before the branch and the main brook join by a road called Brewery Common, to the east of which is a spoon-shaped pond. It travels north east towards Wokefield, passing under Lockrams Lane near Wokefield Farm. There is a pleasant valley here where the brook is dammed to form a small body of water known as Millbarn Pond. It has been a fish pond since at least 1911, and covers an area of 8.46 acres (3.42 ha) The dam was constructed in the 18th century, creating a pond with a maximum depth of 10 feet (3 m) and a surface which is 200 feet (60 m) above sea level. The water is eutrophic, with high levels of nutrients supporting a diverse range of aquatic plants, and outflow from the lake is small, except in wet weather. The pond has been the location for the long-term study of caddisfly by M I Crichton, who studied the pond environment between 1951 and 1982. Using a Robinson light trap, he identified 71 species of caddisfly at the site, including 24 of the 59 species of Limnephilidae resident in Britain.

There is a sluice by the dam at the lower end of the pond, where the water cascades down seven brick steps into a deeply-shaded valley. Travelling further north east through Rookery Wood it passes under Goring Lane at Waterfall Cottage, where there was a small pond on the upstream side of the road in 1899, with a sluice controlling the outflow. Soon afterwards it merges with Burghfield Brook at James's Farm in Grazeley Green. The watercourse is particularly liable to flooding and has been the subject of discussion at West Berkshire Council meetings.

After the junction, Burghfield Brook continues to the north east, skirting around the southern and eastern edges of the Atomic Weapons Establishment Burghfield, and under Burnthouse Bridge, before merging with the much larger Foudry Brook near Hartley Court Farm.

== Water Quality ==
The Environment Agency measure water quality of the river systems in England. Each is given an overall ecological status, which may be one of five levels: high, good, moderate, poor and bad. There are several components that are used to determine this, including biological status, which looks at the quantity and varieties of invertebrates, angiosperms and fish, and chemical status, which compares the concentrations of various chemicals against known safe concentrations. Chemical status is rated good or fail. Lockram Brook is not sufficiently large to get its own entry in the Environment Agency's catchment data. However, under the criteria of the Water Framework Directive, water quality includes an assessment of how easily fish can move along the river, and the presence of a stepped weir at the outflow to Millbarn Pond means that it would probably be rated poor or bad.

== Bibliography ==
- Crichton, M I (6 December 2012). "A study of egg masses of Glyphotaelius Pellucidus". Proceedings of the Fifth International Symposium on Trichoptera: 1986. Springer Science & Business Media. ISBN 978-94-009-4043-7.
- Gibson, Jake (April 2013). "Fish Barrier issues and the Water Framework Directive" (PDF). Northern Ireland Environment Agency.
