= The Priory, Beech Hill =

Listed country house in Berkshire, England

- Location within Berkshire Location within England
- 51°22′25″N 0°59′02″W
- Type: Country House
- Location: Beech Hill, Berkshire, England
- OS grid reference: SU 70817 64340

History
- Built: 16th century
- Built for: The Harrison family
- Rebuilt: 1648

Site notes
- Architectural style: Elizabethan

Listed Building – Grade II*
- Official name: The Priory including adjoining wall on the north east 6582 6435
- Designated: 13 April 1947; 79 years ago
- Reference no.: 1117130

Listed Building – Grade II
- Official name: Dovecote and adjoining wall in The Priory garden, approximately 60 metres south west
- Designated: 13 April 1967; 59 years ago
- Reference no.: 1117131

Listed Building – Grade II
- Official name: Granary at The Priory, approximately 60 metres to the north
- Designated: 28 January 1987; 39 years ago
- Reference no.: 1117132

The Priory is a historic Grade II* listed English country house. It is located southeast of Beech Hill, Berkshire on the banks of the River Loddon.

== History ==
Originally a hermitage associated with Beaumys Castle, located immediately to the northeast, it was later converted into Stratfield Saye Priory. The priory was dissolved in 1399.

The land was leased from 1558 to 1665 by the Harrison family, and it is presumed they built the current house, which has a date of 1648 on the central porch.

In 1947 The Priory was designated a Grade II* listed building. The dovecote in the garden was Grade II listed in 1967 and granary similarly listed in 1987.

== Architecture ==
The house is two-storey and three-gabled. It is built of red English bond brick. Northwest of the house are a dovecote and granary. The late 17th-century garden stretches out to the southwest and is bounded by brick buildings to the northwest and a small canal to the southeast.

== See also ==
- Grade II* listed buildings in Berkshire
