= Spencer Wood =

Spencer Wood may refer to:

- Spencer Wood, the name of Quebec's former Government House; see Government House (Quebec)
- Spencer S. Wood (1861–1940), United States Navy rear admiral
- Spencer Wood (skier) (born 1997), American para alpine skier

== See also ==
- Spencers Wood, a village in the civil parish of Shinfield, Berkshire, England
