= Mortimer Common =

Village in Berkshire, England

Coordinates: 51.377°N 1.063°W

Mortimer
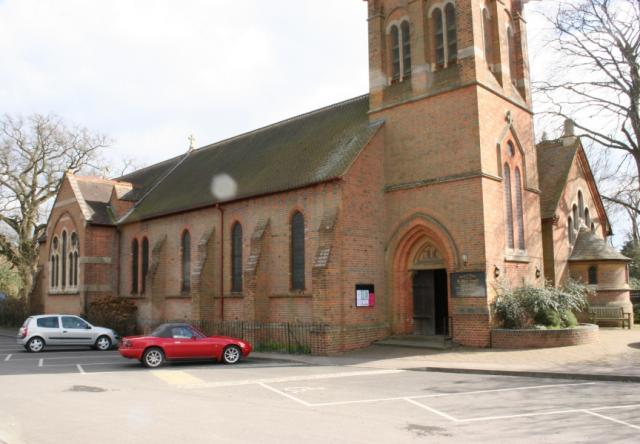
- Church of St.John the Evangelist, Mortimer

- Location within Berkshire
- Population: 3,807 (2011 census including Stratfield Mortimer)
- OS grid reference: SU6565
- Civil parish: Stratfield Mortimer
- Unitary authority: West Berkshire
- Ceremonial county: Berkshire
- Region: South East
- Country: England
- Sovereign state: United Kingdom
- Post town: READING
- Postcode district: RG7
- Dialling code: 0118
- Police: Thames Valley
- Fire: Royal Berkshire
- Ambulance: South Central
- UK Parliament: Reading West and Mid Berkshire

Mortimer Common, generally referred to as simply Mortimer, is a village in the civil parish of Stratfield Mortimer in Berkshire. Mortimer is in the local government district of West Berkshire and is seven miles south-west of Reading.

== Geography ==
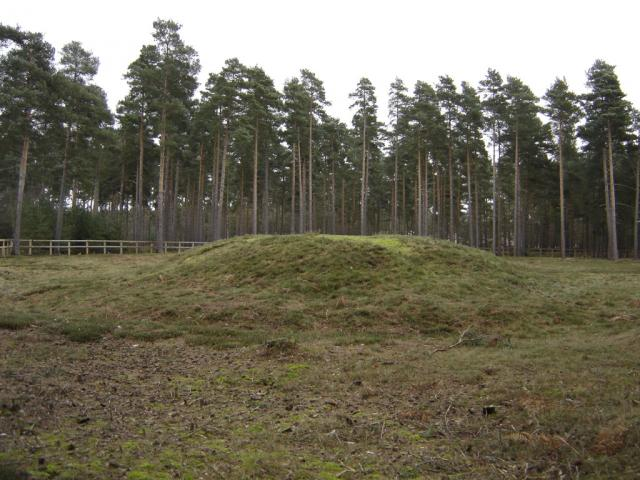
Mortimer Common Barrows. Holden's Firs Barrows, Barrow Cemetery

Mortimer stands at the top of Mortimer Hill, at the bottom of which is Stratfield Mortimer. To the north lies Burghfield Common and Wokefield. To the West lies Mortimer West End and Padworth Common. The Lockram Brook flows through the middle of the parish and joins into Burghfield Brook which is further to the Northeast, this in turn feeds into Foudry Brook, a tributary of the Kennet and Avon Canal. There is much woodland in the area, including Starvale Woods, Wokefield Common and Holden Firs. The three main roads in Mortimer are The Street, West End Road and Victoria Road.

== Businesses ==
There is a surgery, dentist, pharmacy, a post office, Dads Shop (hardware), Co-Op supermarket, Morrisons convenience store, travel agent, Chinese take away, the Church of England parish church of St John the Evangelist. Next to the church is St John's Infant School. There are three pubs in Mortimer Common, each on one of the three main roads through the village: The Horse and Groom in The Street opposite Mortimer Fairground, The Victoria Arms in Victoria Road and The Turner's Arms in West End Road.

== Community halls ==
A new Mortimer village hall with a cricket pavilion has been constructed on the common, it is available for hire. There is also the St John's Hall, that houses the Mortimer Pre-School, holds amateur dramatic shows and is available for hire.

== Transport ==
Bus travel from Reading is provided by Reading Buses services 2 and 2a. Mortimer railway station, on the Reading to Basingstoke Line, is down The Street from the main village, and frequent services are operated by Great Western Railway.

== Sport and leisure ==
Mortimer Village Partnership (MVP) is an independent not for profit organisation that was set up by volunteers in 2009. The purpose of the MVP is to involve people and groups in the life of the village, to improve communications, to connect people together and facilitate activities and events in order to enhance the lives of those who live and work in Mortimer and nearby. Several events are organised annually. including a regular lunch club, theatre trips, travelling theatres, events for children and the famous annual Mortimer Fun Day in July which attracts thousands of visitors from all around. In 2014 the group was awarded The Queen's Award for Voluntary Service and it continues to recognise the hundreds of volunteers annually by presenting them with a certificate and the addition of their name into a book of honour.

Mortimer has a senior football team called Mortimer FC - Saturday teams in the Thames Valley League and East Berks League. Sunday team in the Reading & District Sunday league. There are also youth teams at U12 and U15 level. Mortimer Football Club was founded as the Mortimer Garth Football Club by Miss Bertha G. P. Capron of Garth House (and later of Little Garth), Mortimer. In 1915, Miss Capron had paid for land in St. John's Road and for the construction of a building there, called Garth Club, for young men, in memory of her nephew Nigel, killed in the Great War. Miss Capron (1863-1954) was the eldest daughter of the Rev. George Halliley Capron of Soouthwick Hall and Stoke Doyle, Northamptonshire, and settled in Mortimer with her unmarried sisters after her brother inherited the Southwick estates in 1909. The Garth Club was the origin of Mortimer Garth Football Club, the forerunner to Mortimer FC which is now in the Reading Football League Senior Division, in tier 11 of the football pyramid. Mortimer has won the League four times; in 1993–4, 1994–5, 1996–7 and 2001–02.

Mortimer has amateur cricket and tennis clubs, cubs, scouts, girl guides and brownies clubs as well as the Mortimer Dramatic Society. A community centre was completed in the autumn of 2009, which is used as a cricket pavilion. The fairground is also used for travelling funfairs. On taking over from Sewards Supermarket, Budgens also took over the tradition of arranging the annual 'fun run', a 10 kilometre race around the village, which generally takes place on the last Sunday of September.

== History ==
The name Mortimer stems from the lords of the manor, the Mortimer family, a powerful magnate family and the Earls of March from Wigmore, Herefordshire. The family were given the manor, along with Wigmore Castle by William I shortly after the Norman Conquest and held it throughout the Middle Ages, as recorded in the Domesday Book. Roger de Mortimer, 1st Earl of March was for three years de facto ruler of England after leading a successful rebellion against Edward II, before being overthrown and executed in 1330 by Edward III, with his lands (including Mortimer) seized by the Crown. The Mortimers came close, during the reign of Richard II, to the English throne again, but the claims of the family were ignored and the throne was vested in Henry IV instead. During the Tudor period Mortimer was one of the lands granted to each of the wives of Henry VIII. There are several Bronze Age burial mounds in the area. Excavations at one have shown that it was later used for burials when the Anglo-Saxons moved into the area.

== Notable people ==
- Julia Foot (née Neville) RGN, RMN, DN, BSc (Hons) – District Nurse and Community Matron and Non Medical Prescriber from 1965 to the present day, was born in Briar Lea Road and lived in West End Road and Summerlug (off St Marys Road). She worked at Basingstoke District Hospital, Battle Hospital Reading and Chase Farm in Enfield. Community Nursing in Enfield and Stevenage.
- Professor Kenneth Mason MC (1887-1976), Professor of Geography, Oxford University 1932–53, lived at Sylvanway, West End Road, Mortimer.
- Rt Hon Sir John Mowbray, 1st Bt, PC, MP, JP, DL, DCL (1815-1899), was MP for Oxford University from 1868-99 and was Father of the House of Commons from 1898–99, lived at Warennes Wood, Mortimer.
- Sir Robert Mowbray, 2nd Bt, MP, JP, DL (1850-1916), was MP for Prestwich and Lambeth, lived at Warennes Wood, Mortimer.
- Robert Newman is a former England bowls champion
- Lt. Col. Herbert St Maur Carter D.S.O., M.D.- a surgeon who retired to Mortimer after service in the Royal Army Medical Corps. Decorated by the British and Serbian governments.
- David Tuttle is a former professional footballer and manager
- Roy Pounder was a contestant on University Challenge representing Bangor University
