= Aldermaston Soke =

Hamlet in Hampshire, England

Coordinates: 51.364°N 1.115°W

- Location within Hampshire
- OS grid reference: SU6163
- Shire county: Hampshire
- Region: South East
- Country: England
- Sovereign state: United Kingdom
- Police: Hampshire and Isle of Wight
- Fire: Hampshire and Isle of Wight
- Ambulance: South Central
- UK Parliament: Basingstoke

Aldermaston Soke is a hamlet that lies on the county boundary between Berkshire and Hampshire, and is administratively part of the civil parish of Mortimer West End, which was transferred from Berkshire to Hampshire in 1879.

== Archaeological interest ==
The settlement lies on marshy ground at the bottom of a valley, very near Silchester (Roman Calleva Atrebatum). The modern road follows the course of a Roman road through the hamlet, diverging either side of it. It has been suggested that the dampness of the ground led to a short section of Roman road remaining in use in Aldermaston Soke as a causeway through the valley bottom.

== Botanical interest ==
The damp ground also makes the location of interest to botanists, as a number of plant species that are rare in Britain have been attested here:

- Hypericum maculatum (a species of St John's wort)
- Viola palustris (Marsh violet)
- Lythrum portula (a species of Loosestrife)
- Hieracium umbellatum and
- Hieracium acuminatum (two species of Hawkweed)
- Dactylorhiza praetermissa (Southern Marsh-orchid)

Aldermaston Soke has a site of Special Scientific Interest (SSSI) just to the west. It is called Decoy Pit, Pools and Woods.

== See also ==
- Aldermaston
