= Goddard's Green =

Goddard's Green or Goddards Green may refer to several places in England:

- Goddard's Green, Berkshire, a village near Reading
- Goddards Green, West Sussex, a village near Burgess Hill
- Goddard's Green, Kent, a location near Cranbrook, Kent
