= Nicholas de la Beche =

English noble

- Seneschal of Gascony
- Arms of Nicholas de la Beche: Vaire Argent and Gules
- Died: 1345
- Buried: St Mary's Church, Aldworth, Berkshire
- Spouse: Margery de Poynings

Nicholas de la Beche (died 1345), Seneschal of Gascony, was a 14th-century English noble.

Beche was appointed Constable of the Tower of London in October 1335 and was appointed as governor to Edward of Woodstock, heir to King Edward III of England in 1336. During 1339, Beche married Margery Poynings, the widow of Edmund Bacon. The young princesses Isabella and Joanna, daughters of King Edward III and Queen Philippa of Hainault, were left in the care of Beche in 1340; however, upon the unexpected return of the king, the living conditions and guarding of the princesses were found to be inadequate and Beche was arrested.

During 1342, licenses were issued to Beche permitting him to castellate his houses at La Beche, Watlyington and Beaumys. In 1343, Beche was appointed Seneschal of Gascony and in 1344, he was appointed Governor of Montgomery Castle in Wales. Beche was sent in 1345 as one of the commissioners to treat the betrothal of the English princess Joanna with Peter of Castile, the eldest son of King Alfonso XI of Castile and Maria of Portugal. Beche was employed in King Edward III's wars in Brittany and Gascony.

Beche died in 1345, leaving no heirs, his wife surviving him.

== Citations ==
Political offices
Preceded by Oliver Ingham	Seneschal of Gascony; 1343–1345	Succeeded by Ralph, Earl of Stafford
Honorary titles
Preceded by	Constable of the Tower; 1335–1340	Succeeded by
