= Baughurst =

Village and parish in Hampshire, England

Coordinates: 51.3561°N 1.1651°W

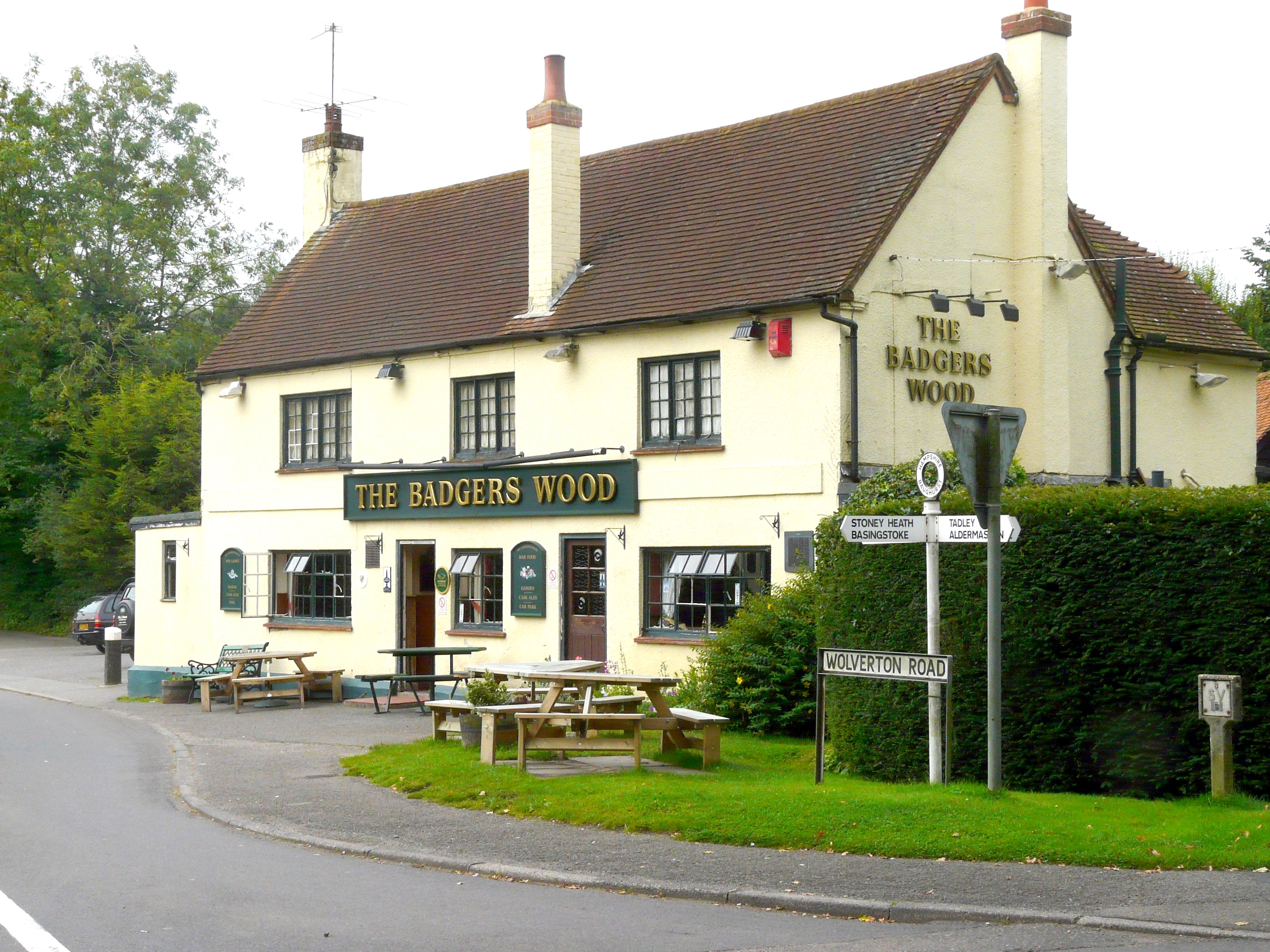
- The Badger's Wood public house, demonstrating the folk etymology of Baughurst

- Location within Hampshire
- Area: 2.8 sq mi (7.3 km^{2})
- Population: 2,473 (2011 Census including Inhurst)
  - Density: 883/sq mi (341/km^{2})
- OS grid reference: SU582600
- District: Basingstoke and Deane
- Shire county: Hampshire
- Region: South East
- Country: England
- Sovereign state: United Kingdom
- Post town: Tadley
- Postcode district: RG26
- Dialling code: 0118
- Police: Hampshire and Isle of Wight
- Fire: Hampshire and Isle of Wight
- Ambulance: South Central
- UK Parliament: North West Hampshire
- Website: www.baughurst-pc.gov.uk

Baughurst /ˈbɔːɡhərst/ is a village and civil parish in Hampshire, England. It is located west of the town of Tadley, 6 miles (9.7 km) north of Basingstoke. In the 2001 census, it had a population of 2,473.

The village is known for its historical association with Tadley in the manufacture of besom brooms.

== History ==
A number of tumuli are in the parish, suggesting that a settlement may have been in the Baughurst area in the Stone Age, Bronze Age, Iron Age, and Roman times. Portway, the Roman road between London (Londinium) and Dorchester (Durnovaria) via nearby Silchester (Calleva Atrebatum), ran through the parish. The recorded history of Baughurst traces to Anglo Saxon Britain. In 885, the area was given to the Bishop of Winchester, and became part of Hurstbourne Priors near Andover. Baughurst was not mentioned in the Domesday Survey of 1086; it was probably still part of Hurstbourne Priors. During the late 13th century, a number of tithings within Baughurst were held by the Coudray family on behalf of Edward I.

In 1440, Baughurst became part of the Manor of Manydown near Basingstoke. In the mid-16th century, Baughurst's tithings were bought by the Palmes family. Around the same time, the Dissolution of the Monasteries occurred and Aldermaston returned to Winchester Cathedral in 1541. It later swapped to Manydown once more, before being sold in 1649 and returned to Winchester in 1660. After the Civil War, the area became one of the wealthiest Quaker centres in the south of England. After George Fox's visit to Basingstoke in 1657, a dissident – James Potter – was imprisoned for standing up in church and reading from a Quaker paper which conflicted with standard church beliefs. After his release, Potter established a Friends meeting house in the village. After the Act of Toleration 1689, Baughurst became less valuable to the Quakers – many joined the Anglicans. The majority, however, began following the Methodist movement of John and Charles Wesley, who regularly visited Baughurst. The Wesleys' friend, George Whitefield, lived in Baughurst around 1736.

In the late 18th century, Jane Austen (who lived in nearby Steventon) visited Baughurst Priory. She wrote about her visit in a letter to her sister Cassandra.

In 1847, Baughurst became part of the Duke of Wellington's Stratfield Saye estate. The subsequent dukes were the main land owners of Baughurst until 1943. In 1942, land was cleared to build RAF Aldermaston. One of the RAF base's hangars, located at Baughurst Plantation, was used to assemble Spitfires. Between 1943 and 1945, the plant produced approximately 500 photo-reconnaissance aircraft, including Mark IX and XIX. It also produced some Mark IX and XIV fighter aircraft. Over the next 30 years, the parish's population grew from 490 to 2,250. This because of the RAF base and, later, the Atomic Weapons Research Establishment.

=== Toponymy ===
A number of explanations for the name "Baughurst" exist. "Hurst" was Old English for a thick wood or wooded hill. "Baughurst" may either refer to the wood inhabited by a Saxon named Beagga, or by badgers; "wood of the badgers". The latter is referred to in the name of one of the village's pubs, "The Badger's Wood".

A number of alternative spellings of Baughurst have been recorded, including Bagganhyrst (11th century), Baggehurst (12th century), Bagehurst (15th century), Baugust (18th century), and Baghurst (19th century).

== Geography ==
Baughurst is 2.8 square miles (7.3 km^{2}) in area, and is neighboured by a number of parishes in Berkshire and Hampshire:

The tithings of Ham and Inhurst are within the parish; they were first recorded in 1298. Baughurst Brook, which is a tributary of the River Enborne, is a Site of Nature Conservation Interest.

=== Geology ===
Baughurst is situated on a natural ridge between Silchester and Brimpton Common. The ridge, which is situated towards the north of the parish, is approximately 100 metres (330 ft) above sea level. Moving south through the parish, the land drops by 30 metres (98 ft) to Baughurst Brook, before rising to 143 metres (469 ft) at the northern edge of the North Hampshire Downs. The brook leaves the lower land in the parish liable to flooding. The soil and subsoil of the area are clay. The Brook travels East to eventually become the Foudry Brook. Some tributaries of the River Enborne are also found in the area around Baughurst.

== Economy ==
Along with Tadley, Baughurst is associated with the manufacture of besom brooms. Historically, much of the land in the parish was heathland used to grow birch trees, which were taken to Tadley to manufacture the brooms.

== Landmarks ==
Built in 1937, Lattice House was originally the depot for Kent's Buses and was built with a single-span wooden Belfast truss roof. It was used for the storage of Spitfire aircraft parts during 1943–1945, which were assembled at the neighbouring RAF Aldermaston. At one time the building's arched roof was the largest single-span wooden roof in Western Europe.

== Education ==
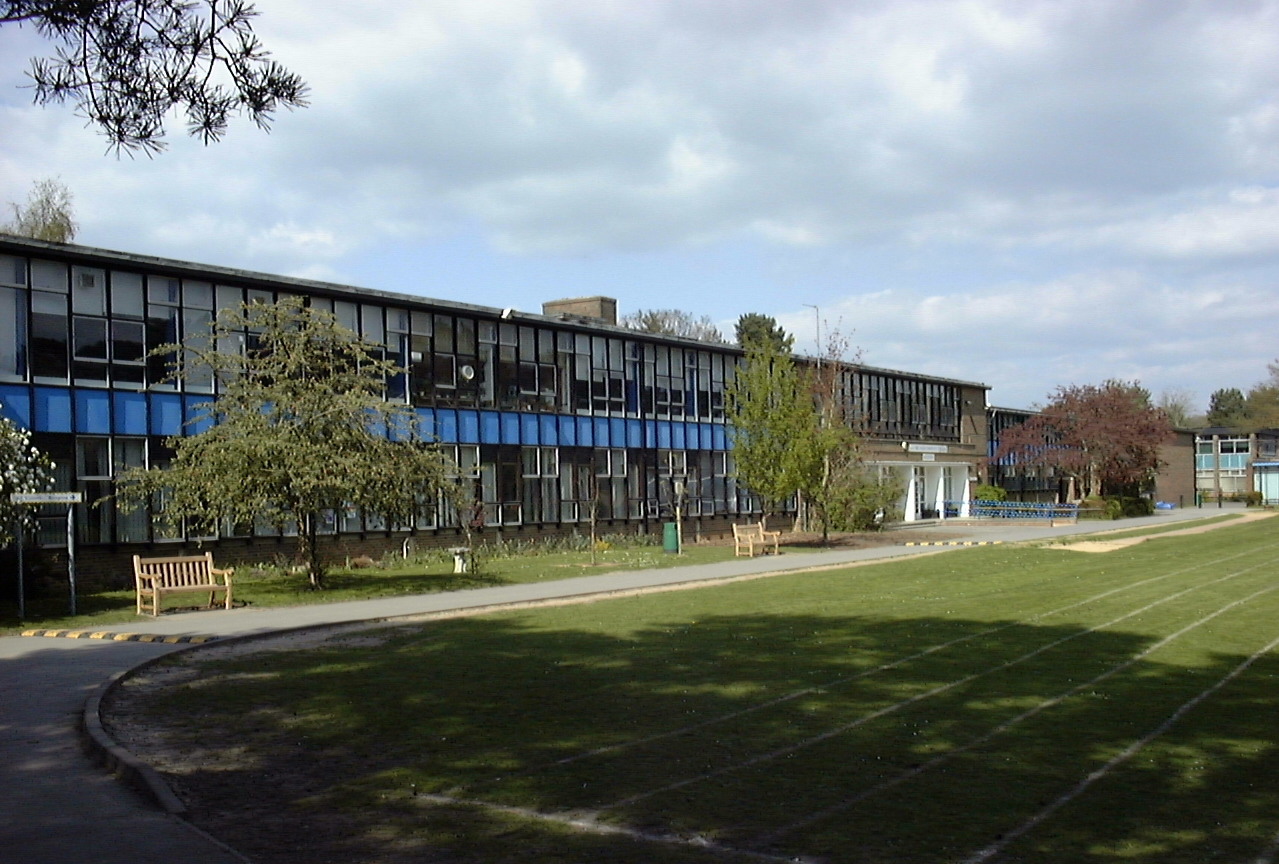
The Hurst School

The Hurst School is in the village, and provides secondary education for students between the ages of 11 and 16. It is the main secondary school in the Tadley area. Aside from one independent school, the parish's primary education is in nearby Tadley.

== Religious sites ==
The parish church is dedicated to Saint Stephen, and is in the Diocese of Winchester. The church consists of a chancel, vestry, nave and a tower. The tower, which is 100 feet (30 m) tall, forms part of the porch. It is built in flint and incorporates earlier materials. The bell tower houses five bells, all of which were cast by Thomas Swaine in 1775.

The current church was built by Benjamin Ferrey in 1845 on the site of an earlier (possibly 12th century) chapel, which had partially collapsed the same year. Baughurst had a Primitive Methodist Church between 1872 and 1987. The Quakers established a meeting house at Brown's Farm in the mid 17th century, which operated until 1791.

== Sport ==
Baughurst AFC, the village's association football club, used to play in Tadley. AFC Aldermaston train and play at the Atomic Weapons Establishment on the Baughurst-Tadley border.
