= The Frith =

Iron Age hillfort in Hampshire, England

Coordinates: 51.363501°N 1.101283°W

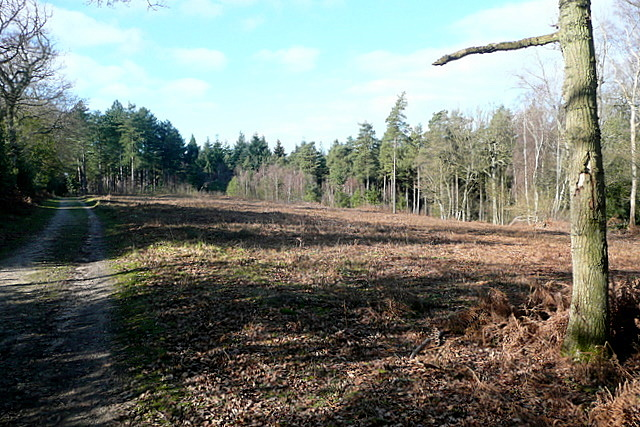
Interior of the fort, viewed from the east

The Frith is a small univallate Iron Age hillfort to the north of Silchester, Calleva Atrebatum, Roman town in the English county of Hampshire. A single bank covers all sides apart from the south east, and is at the most about 5 feet (1.5 m) high on the western edge. A ditch is also traceable for the length of the bank, although at varying states.

The area to the north and northwest is partially wooded. A local footpath crosses the site east to west. The site slopes from approximately 90 to 95 metres (295 to 312 ft) in the west, with the summit of the unnamed hill (102 metres (335 ft) AOD) approximately 500 metres (1,600 ft) to the southwest. Close by to the south lies a Roman road heading into Calleva Atrebatum. Also nearby, 500 metres (1,600 ft) to the west, lies a further smaller unidentified enclosure.

== Location ==
The site is within Benyon's Inclosure to the North of Silchester, part of Mortimer West End Civil Parish, in the county of Hampshire

- Map sources for The Frith
