= Stratfield Mortimer =

Coordinates: 51°22′23″N 1°02′13″W

- Village and civil parish
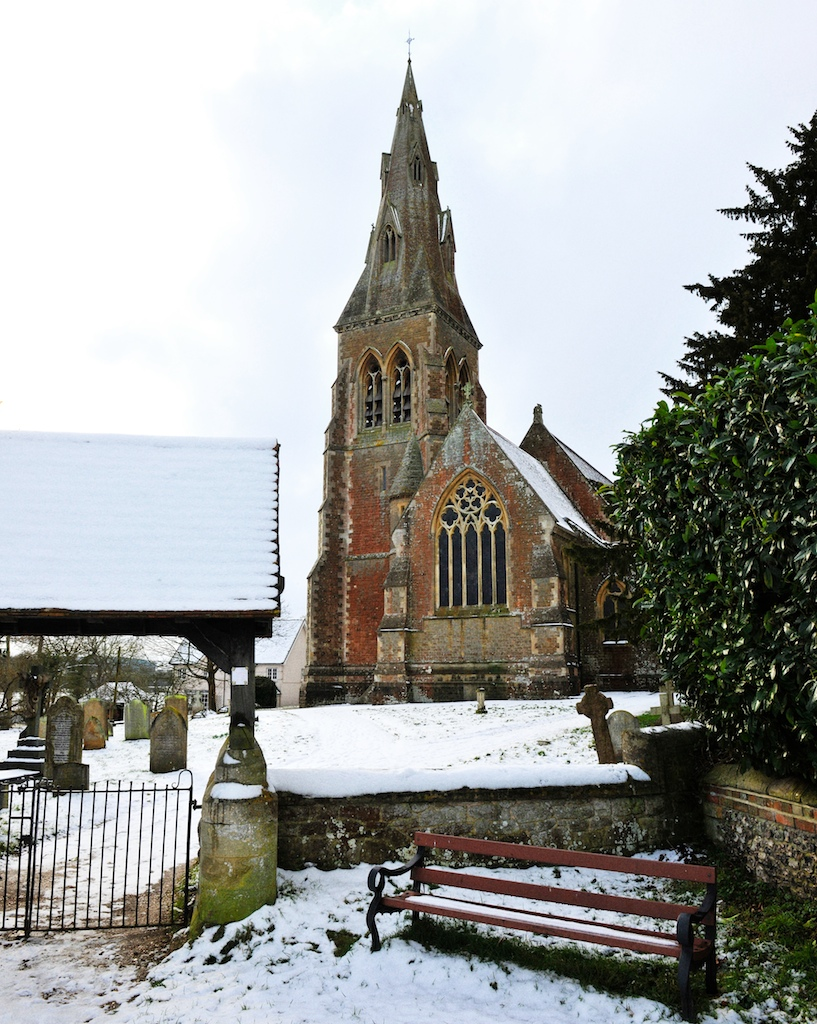
- St Mary's Church

- Location within Berkshire
- Area: 9.67 km^{2} (3.73 sq mi)
- Population: 3,807 (2011 census including Mortimer Common)
  - Density: 394/km^{2} (1,020/sq mi)
- OS grid reference: SU6664
- Civil parish: Stratfield Mortimer
- Unitary authority: West Berkshire
- Ceremonial county: Berkshire
- Region: South East
- Country: England
- Sovereign state: United Kingdom
- Post town: READING
- Postcode district: RG7
- Dialling code: 0118
- Police: Thames Valley
- Fire: Royal Berkshire
- Ambulance: South Central
- UK Parliament: Wokingham

Stratfield Mortimer is a village and civil parish, just south of Reading, in the English county of Berkshire and unitary authority area of West Berkshire.

== History ==
The manor of Stratfield dates back to the time of Edward the Confessor. The 1086 Domesday Book records it as being held by Ralf Mortimer, and it stayed in the ownership of the noble Mortimer family until their descendant, the Earl of March, grandson of Anne de Mortimer, became King Edward IV.

In 1559, Elizabeth I granted the manor to Lord Hunsdon, who in turn passed it to the Marquess of Winchester who joined it to the manor of Englefield, Berkshire.

The parish church of St Mary is a grade II listed Victorian gothic building, built in 1869 by Richard Armstrong on the site of a much older church, including the remains of a Saxon tomb.

== Geography ==
The south and south-east half of the parish consists of farms with a small percentage of woodland and is bisected by the Foudry Brook and is adjacent to the Reading to Basingstoke Line which is more than 40% on raised embankments but in the far south is in a cutting. The linear village of Stratfield Mortimer climbs Mortimer Hill which rises westward from the Foudry Brook. It has no fixed formal or historic boundaries with Mortimer Common (often colloquially referred to simply as Mortimer), the more populated parts of the parish are located at the top of the hill.

The north-western 5% of the land is Mortimer Woods or common land which blends into Wokefield Common - Mortimer Woods has a set of scheduled monuments – one large, steep Bronze Age round barrow and three further smaller bowl barrows. The Foudry Brook is crossed by the scenic Victorian Tun Bridge. The Lockram Brook flows through the middle of the parish and there is more than 10% woodland making up the parish open to the public under the Countryside and Rights of Way Act 2000 including Starvale Woods, Wokefield Common and Holden Firs. The southern boundary is a straight footpath called the Devil's Highway because it sits on the line of the western stretch of the Roman road from Londinium (London) to Calleva Atrebatum (Silchester).

== Other villages in the parish ==
=== Mortimer Common ===
The main settlement in this parish is Mortimer Common which has a surgery, dentist, pharmacy, a post office, a hardware shop, Co-op supermarket, Morrisons convenience store, travel agent, Chinese/fish and chips take away, the Church of England parish church of St John the Evangelist and Mortimer Methodist Church. St John's Church was built in 1881 by Richard Benyon of Englefield House.

Next to the church is St John's Infant School, now federated with St Mary's Junior School which is down the hill, nearer the station. At the centre of Mortimer Common, in The Fairground, are 20 acres of land managed by the parish council for public recreation.

The large house, Mortimer Hill, is the historic home of the Hunter family. There are three pubs in the village, each on one of the three main roads through the village: The Horse and Groom in The Street opposite Mortimer Fairground, The Victoria Arms in Victoria Road and The Turner's Arms in West End Road. A new Mortimer village hall with a cricket pavilion has been constructed on the Fairground, it is available for hire. There is also the St John's Hall, that houses the Mortimer Pre-School, holds amateur dramatic shows and is available for hire.

=== Mortimer West End ===
Before the mid-nineteenth century when parishes were only ecclesiastical, Stratfield Mortimer was a cross-county parish: the Hampshire part was known as Mortimer West End. It became an ecclesiastical parish in 1866 and acquired its own civil parish in 1894. A faint vestige of this is that Stratfield Mortimer ecclesiastical parish today includes Wokefield Common and a small uninhabited fraction of Mortimer West End.

== Amenities ==
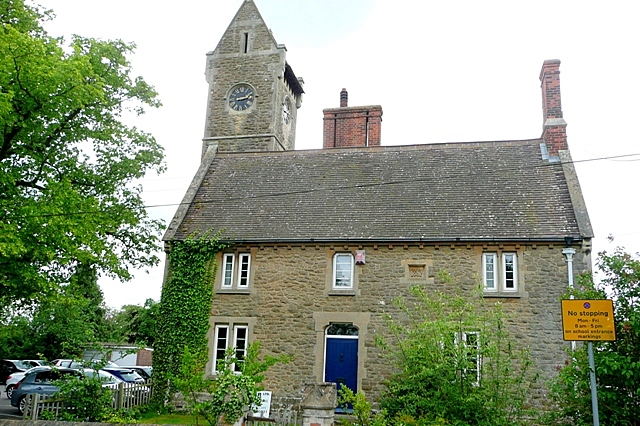
Mortimer St Mary's Junior School School

The village includes the Cinnamon Tree Indian restaurant, (formerly the Fox and Horn, and prior to that, the Railway Arms public house), St Mary's Church of England parish church, Mortimer St John's Infant School, Mortimer St Mary's Junior School and the headquarters of the Berkshire Federation of Women's Institutes. Stratfield Mortimer is served by Mortimer railway station on the Reading to Basingstoke Line. Reading Buses run the Vitality 2 and 2a routes from Mortimer to Peppard Common via Burghfield, Reading Station & Sonning Common.

== Sport ==
Mortimer Tennis club, play from 2 courts on the Fairground. Mortimer Cricket Club, play out of the Mortimer village hall on the Fairground. Mortimer Football Club, play on the Alfred Palmer Memorial Field to the west of Mortimer, beside The Turners Arms. The local golf course is at Wokefield Park.

== Demography ==
2011 Published Statistics: Population, home ownership and extracts from Physical Environment, surveyed in 2005
Output area	Homes owned outright	Owned with a loan	Socially rented	Privately rented	Other	km^{2} roads	km^{2} water	km^{2} domestic gardens	Usual residents	km^{2}
Civil parish	543	559	246	181	26	0.242	0.028	0.722	3807	9.67
