= Grazeley =

Coordinates: 51.3958°N 0.9958°W

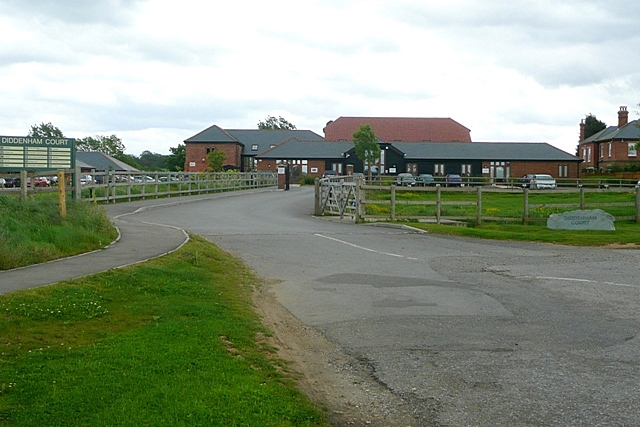
- Diddenham Court, Grazeley, formerly part of Diddenham Manor Farm

- Location within Berkshire
- Population: 280 (Census 2001)
- OS grid reference: SU698668
- Civil parish: Shinfield
- Unitary authority: Wokingham; West Berkshire
- Ceremonial county: Berkshire
- Region: South East
- Country: England
- Sovereign state: United Kingdom
- Post town: READING
- Postcode district: RG7
- Dialling code: 0118
- Police: Thames Valley
- Fire: Royal Berkshire
- Ambulance: South Central
- UK Parliament: Wokingham

Grazeley is an area covering the small villages of Grazeley in the civil parish of Shinfield and Grazeley Green in the civil parish of Wokefield, 4 miles (6.4 km) south of Reading in the English county of Berkshire. To the east is the village of Spencers Wood, to the west is Wokefield and to the south is Beech Hill.

== Local government ==
Grazeley was historically divided between the parishes of Sulhamstead Abbots, Sulhamstead Bannister and Shinfield. The part around Grazeley Village remains in the civil parish of Shinfield. That part around Grazeley Green was a detached tithing of the ancient parish of Sulhamstead Bannister and another area was a detached part of Sulhamstead Abbots. These formed into a separate ecclesiastical parish in 1860. The latter became a separate civil parish in 1866. Both the Sulhamstead parts of Grazeley were later absorbed by the parish of Wokefield.

== History ==
Holy Trinity Church, Grazeley

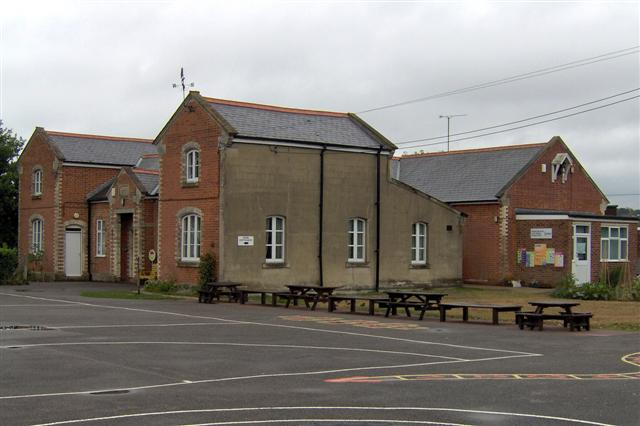
Grazeley Parochial Primary School

Grazeley Village Memorial Hall

Agriculture was the dominant feature of the village and the surrounding areas is still seen in the fields of Grazeley, although there are a few farm animals to be seen. The name first appears as Grazeley around 1598 and is derived from the Anglo-Saxon Graeg-Sol meaning Badgers' Wallowing Place. It has also been known by the names of Greyshall, Greasull, Greyshull, Gresley and Graseley. Around the late 19th century, it was also referred to as Lambwood Hill. In 1802, Dr. George Mitford, the flamboyant father of local author Mary Russell Mitford, moved to Grazeley Court Farm for the purpose of "being an English country gentleman with an estate and dignities accruing to the position". His flamboyancy, self-importance and addiction to gambling at cards brought him and his family into debt and unhappiness.

Grazeley Court served two purposes for the family – the house was used for the extravagant balls and parties and the outhouses and stables used to establish Dr. Mitford's greyhound kennels. During his time here, George renamed the property to Bertram House after an ancestor, Sir Roger Bertram, Baron Mitford, who lived in Northumberland in the 13th century. William Isaac Palmer, a member of the local Palmer family of biscuit fame, lived at Grazeley Court from 1879 to 1895. A 2003 case study of Hartley Court Farm by the Museum of English Rural Life looked at the activities of local organisations and individuals in the local area, including Grazeley and Shinfield.

== Local facilities ==
The village has never had a village shop or post office. In the early 20th century, letters were received via Reading with collection boxes outside the church and outside Grazeley Court farm. Money orders could be sent from the nearest office in Three Mile Cross and the nearest Telegraph Office was at Spencers Wood.

=== Holy Trinity Church ===
Opened in 1850, the 14th century style Church of England parish church of the Holy Trinity was a gift from the Bishop of Oxford. Built in flint and stone, it consists of a chancel, nave, south porch and belfry with a single bell. Inside the Church an oak tablet (which has since been moved to the village hall) on the north wall remembers the local men who lost their lives during the two World Wars, with the inscription:

Ye that live on in English Pastures Green,
Remember us and think what might have been

The church closed in January 2006.

=== School ===
Grazeley Parochial Primary School was built in 1861 at a cost of £442 16s 9d, initially to accommodate 100 pupils. As children walked from nearby Spencers Wood, Shinfield and Burghfield, two extensions to the school in 1893 and 1913 increased capacity to 150. The Merry's Educational Foundation, established by deed in 1862, then proved by will in 1873, provided £20 a year in accordance with the donor's will to provide clothing for poor children – ten boys and ten girls attending the school. Built into the school was the Merry's Trust Cottage where the District Nurse lived rent free with heating and maintenance costs being partly covered by dedicated savings left in the bank for this purpose. After years of disuse, the cottage was refurbished in 1996 for use by the school for administrative and child resource areas. Originally an all-age school it became a primary school in 1944 and now teaches up to 90 pupils aged between five and eleven, mainly from Grazeley village, Beech Hill, Three Mile Cross, Spencers Wood and parts of Burghfield.

=== Grazeley Village Memorial Hall ===
Opened in 1956 the village memorial hall, normally known simply as Grazeley Village Hall, provides a venue for the local community, clubs and societies. The Hall is on Grazeley village green, adjacent to the school and the church. Throughout 2006 it celebrated its golden jubilee with numerous events including a fun run and a summer ball.

=== AWE Burghfield ===
Within the Grazeley Green part of Wokefield parish and in adjoining Burghfield is the Ministry of Defence's Atomic Weapons Research Establishment factory responsible for the final assembly, maintenance and decommissioning of the UK's nuclear deterrent alongside the main AWE site at Aldermaston.

== Sources ==
- Kirkwood, Kerr (1992). Grazeley village 1800–1940: personnified [sic] by its farmers. Reading: Berkshire Local History Association.
