= Goddard's Green, Berkshire =

Coordinates: 51°23′36″N 1°02′38″W

Goddard's Green
- Hamlet
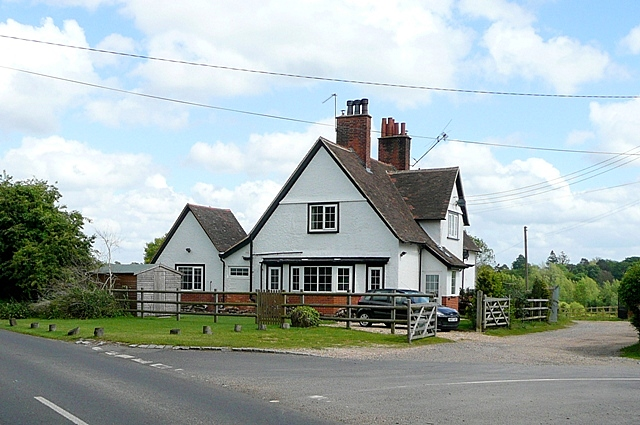
- A house on the corner of the green

- Location within Berkshire
- OS grid reference: SU665665
- Civil parish: Wokefield
- Unitary authority: West Berkshire
- Ceremonial county: Berkshire
- Region: South East
- Country: England
- Sovereign state: United Kingdom
- Post town: READING
- Postcode district: RG7
- Dialling code: 0118
- Police: Thames Valley
- Fire: Royal Berkshire
- Ambulance: South Central
- UK Parliament: Berkshire

Goddard's Green is a hamlet and part of the civil parish of Wokefield in Berkshire, England. The settlement lies between the villages of Burghfield Common and Mortimer Common, and is located approximately 5.5 miles (8.9 km) south-east of Reading. The Garth and South Berks Hunt had kennels here until 2002.
