= Spencers Wood =

Village in Berkshire, England

Coordinates: 51.3944°N 0.9722°W

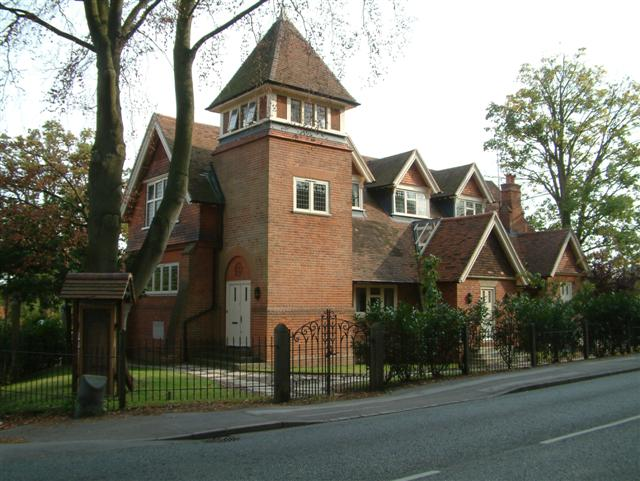
- The Chapel, Spencers Wood

- Location within Berkshire
- Population: 2011 Census
- Civil parish: Shinfield
- Unitary authority: Wokingham
- Ceremonial county: Berkshire
- Region: South East
- Country: England
- Sovereign state: United Kingdom
- Post town: Reading
- Postcode district: RG7
- Dialling code: 0118
- Police: Thames Valley
- Fire: Royal Berkshire
- Ambulance: South Central
- UK Parliament: Wokingham

Spencers Wood is a village in the Borough of Wokingham, Berkshire, England, 4 miles (6.4 km) south of Reading. The village of Three Mile Cross adjoins it to the north, and both form part of the civil parish of Shinfield.

Basingstoke Road, the historic main road between Reading and Basingstoke, runs through the village, though it has been bypassed by the A33 to the east, which separates Spencers Wood from Grazeley.

== History ==
Shield-of-Arms of the Barons le Despencer, from whom Spencers Wood possibly gets its name.

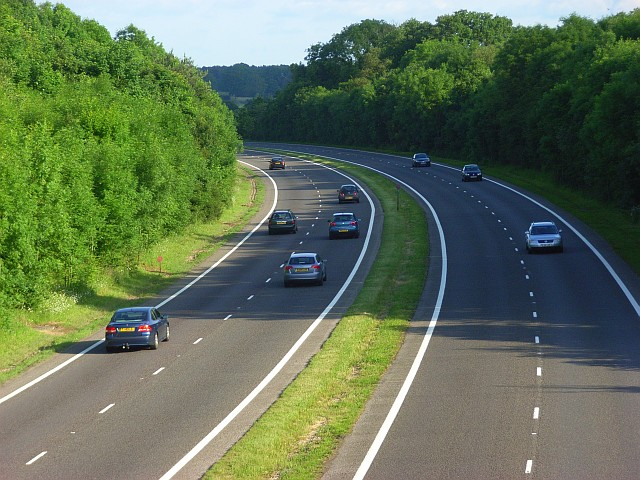
The A33, to the West of Spencers Wood

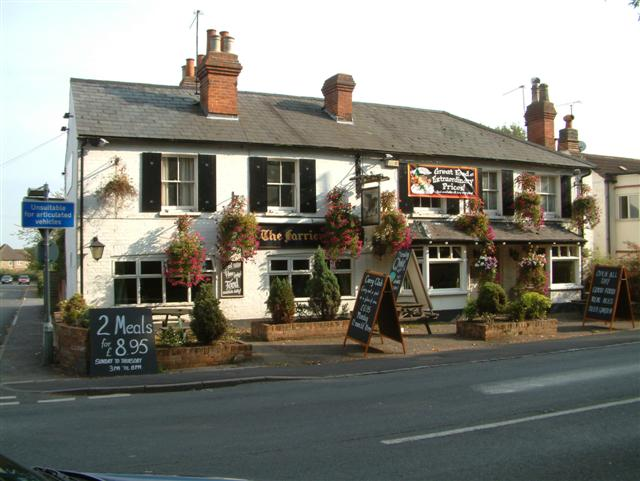
The Farriers Arms

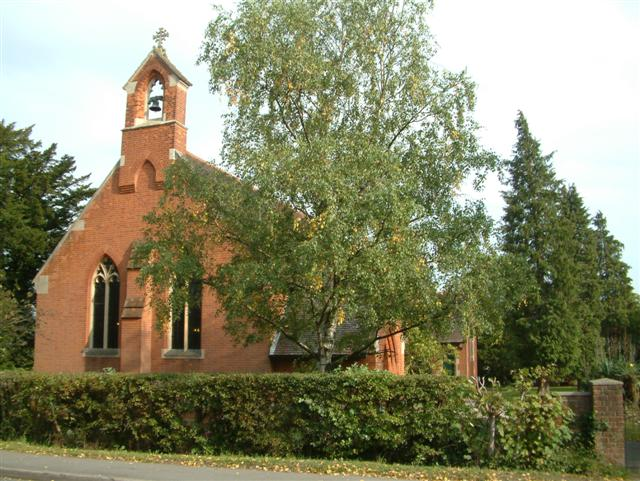
St. Michael & All Angels, Spencers Wood

The earliest confirmed reference to the name 'Spencers Wood' dates from 1500, when a man named John Blunt left 3s 4d for the repair of a road through the wood called Spencers Wood. The name of the wood may derive from the le Despencer family — a Norman family – who held half a knight's fee in Swallowfield in the 13th century, but there is no confirmed documentary evidence for this. Before that, the area was probably part of the Royal Forest (Windsor Great Park). By 1761 when John Roque published his map of Berkshire, there was no wood as such.

There was instead a common – one of a series of commons and greens south of Reading – and on the Ordnance Survey maps of the later nineteenth century, the area is referred to as 'Spencerswood Common', even though the common had by then been enclosed. The area from Three Mile Cross to the boundary with Hampshire beyond Riseley, including part of Swallowfield – Part Lane in Swallowfield marks the partition – was until 1844 a detached portion of Wiltshire. (In the 13th century, Spencers Wood was administered by William Longespée, Earl of Salisbury and his court in Amesbury.) On 20 October 1844 in the Counties (Detached Parts) Act 1844 the area became part of Berkshire.

Around 1816 a non-conformist chapel (Congregational) was built near the corner of Hyde End Road and Basingstoke Road, set back from the road near the fourth mile post from Reading on the Reading to Basingstoke turnpike. In 1905 it was replaced by a new larger church (nearer the road), which, due to falling attendances, closed in 1999 and was subsequently converted into apartments. In the late nineteenth century this was the only church in the village and, with its Institute serving as a village hall, tennis courts etc., provided a focus for social activity in the village.

=== After the common was enclosed ===
By 1864 all of the common land had been enclosed. On the west side of Basingstoke Road, north of Beech Hill Road, two gentlemen established country estates: the local philanthropist Frederick Allfrey, who built Stanbury (where Wellington Court now is) and William Merry, who was a County magistrate and a visiting magistrate to Reading Gaol, as well as Secretary at War Lord Palmerston's private secretary from 1812 to 1828. The open area in front of Merry's house, Highlands, is still known as 'the Common'. The east side of Basingstoke Road was divided among many owners, who progressively sold off the land for development.

By 1880, Spencers Wood had become a thriving village with a population of 600, of whom 200 were children. Most of the adults worked in the fields or were in domestic service. Victorian and Edwardian style houses were built along the Basingstoke Road using bricks baked at the local Swain family kiln. The Square became the heart of the village during this building period, and many of these houses still stand. In 1890 Frederick Allfrey built an Infants' School opposite the end of Hyde End Road. It closed as a school in 1915, as both Lambs Lane and Ryeish Green schools were open by then. The building continued to be used for educational purposes, but since the 1970s has been used as a library.

In spite of its growth, Spencers Wood was still split between the ecclesiastical parishes of Shinfield, Swallowfield and Grazeley. This changed in 1908 when the Church of St Michael and All Angels was consecrated. The ecclesiastical parish of Spencers Wood was created five years later, although some parts of the village remained in the parish of Grazeley. In 2004 the parishes of Spencers Wood and Grazeley with Beech Hill were united under a single PCC, and the same year became part of the United Benefice of Loddon Reach. Also in 1908, Lambs Lane school opened, ending the need for older children to walk to Swallowfield's Russell Hall, Shinfield or Grazeley School. The Arts and Crafts-style Village Hall was opened in 1911 and is run by a board of trustees on behalf of the village inhabitants.

=== World War Two ===
Spencers Wood, being a rural community, was unaffected by the Blitz. Few German bombs fell in the area, which was just as well as the village had no air-raid shelters. One German plane was shot down locally. Rationing also had little effect on the village since a majority of villagers were too poor to notice a real reduction in goods. Food was grown and caught locally as part of the dig for victory programme and the black-market was able to supply all excess demand. The main impact of the war was the influx of people.

Two coaches of evacuees arrived in the village in September 1939. Evacuee children and local children were educated separately until Christmas 1939. Canadian forces were stationed at Stanbury (where Wellington Court now is) for a while, and a small POW camp was opened there after the Canadians relocated. Some POWs helped on the local farms. The village hall served as the Local Defence Volunteers headquarters. Basingstoke Road was the main road to Aldershot, and frequent troop convoys ran through the village. After the war, many soldiers, evacuees and prisoners of war decided to settle in the village.

=== Recent history ===
The first street lighting in the village was installed after the war. In 1954, Spencers Wood Women's Institute was formed. It closed in the mid-1980s. In the 1960s, the M4 Motorway was built and became a man-made barrier between the village and Reading. In the 1980s, the A33 Swallowfield Bypass severed roads to the village of Grazeley lying to the East.

== Village services ==
- The local library is part of Wokingham Borough Council's Libraries. The building was originally an infants' school (opened in 1890).
- The village post office is on the Basingstoke Road. It has been a post office since 1885, and was a manual telephone exchange until 1934. The oldest surviving postbox in the village dates from King George V's reign.
