= Our Village =

Literary sketches by Mary Russell Mitford

Our Village is a collection of about 100 literary sketches of rural life written by Mary Russell Mitford (1787–1855), and originally published during the 1820s and 1830s. The series first appeared in The Lady's Magazine. The full title is: Our Village: Sketches of Rural Character and Scenery. The vivid series was based upon life in Three Mile Cross, a hamlet in the parish of Shinfield (south-east of Reading in Berkshire), where she lived.

Miss Mitford's own short preface states:

'The following pages contain an attempt to delineate country scenery and country manners, as they exist in a small village in the south of England. The writer may at least claim the merit of a hearty love of her subject, and of that local and personal familiarity, which only a long residence in one neighbourhood could have enabled her to attain. Her descriptions have always been written on the spot, and at the moment, and, in nearly every instance, with the closest and most resolute fidelity to the place and the people. If she be accused of having given a brighter aspect to her villagers than is usually met with in books, she cannot help it, and would not if she could. She has painted, as they appeared to her, their little frailties and their many virtues, under an intense and thankful conviction that, in every condition of life, goodness and happiness may be found by those who seek them, and never more surely than in the fresh air, the shade, and the sunshine of nature.' (1835 Edition, I, pp.v-vi)

== Editions ==
- Original edition: (Whittaker & Co., London), Volume 1 1824; Volume 2 1826; Volume 3 1828; Volume 4 1830; Volume 5 1832.
- New edition in three volumes: 1835 (Whittaker & Co., London), with vignettes engraved by Baxter.
- New edition: (Macmillan & Co, London, 1893), with introduction by Anne Isabella Thackeray Ritchie, illustrated by Hugh Thomson (1860-1920).
- Our Village is fully and openly accessible in the Baldwin Library of Historical Children's Literature Digital Collection
- For a 1909 publish date, Stanhope Forbes illustrated Sketches of English Life and Character: Sketches of English Life and Character; with sixteen reproductions from the paintings of Stanhope A. Forbes. Edinburgh: T. N. Foulis, 1909.
  - Sketches of English Life and Character. A. C. McClurg & Co.; 1910. (U.S. edition)
- Sketches of English Life and Character; Stanhope A. Forbes (illus.) Henley-on-Thames: Foulis, 1924
