= Beech Hill, Berkshire =

Village in Berkshire, England

Coordinates: 51.3743°N 0.9992°W

Beech Hill
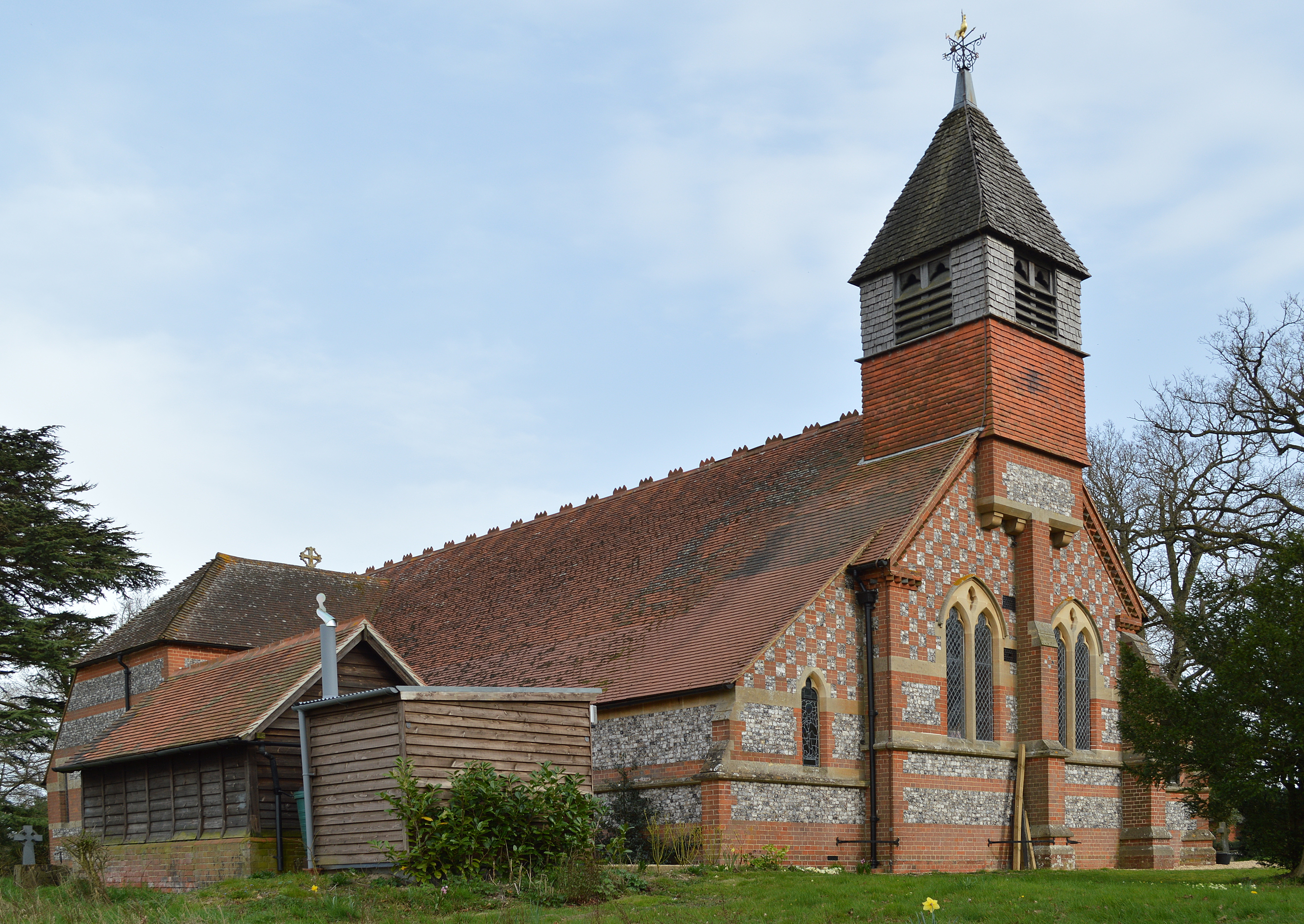
- St Mary the Virgin Church

- Location within Berkshire
- Area: 4.70 km^{2} (1.81 sq mi)
- Population: 294 (2011 census)
  - Density: 63/km^{2} (160/sq mi)
- OS grid reference: SU696644
- Civil parish: Beech Hill
- Unitary authority: West Berkshire
- Ceremonial county: Berkshire
- Region: South East
- Country: England
- Sovereign state: United Kingdom
- Post town: Reading
- Postcode district: RG7
- Dialling code: 0118
- Police: Thames Valley
- Fire: Royal Berkshire
- Ambulance: South Central
- UK Parliament: Wokingham

Beech Hill is a small village and civil parish in Berkshire, England. It is in the south east of the West Berkshire unitary authority area and bounds Hampshire and Wokingham district.

== Etymology ==
Beech Hill is a Norman name derived from the family of De La Bec, usually resident at Aldworth, but who also had a home at Beaumys Castle, just over the parish boundary in Swallowfield.

== Geography ==
Beech Hill stretches from the River Loddon, just west of the A33 in the east, to Trunkwell in the west and to Clappers Farm in the north, and to the Hampshire border, above Fair Cross, in the south. The village sits on a small hill above the Loddon Valley at the junction of Beech Hill Road and Wood Lane. The Foudry Brook, a tributary of the River Kennet, and the Reading–Basingstoke railway line, run through the north of the parish.

=== Natural conservation areas ===
The Stanford End Mill and River Loddon site of Special Scientific Interest (SSSI) is partially within the parish, just to the south east of the village.

== History ==
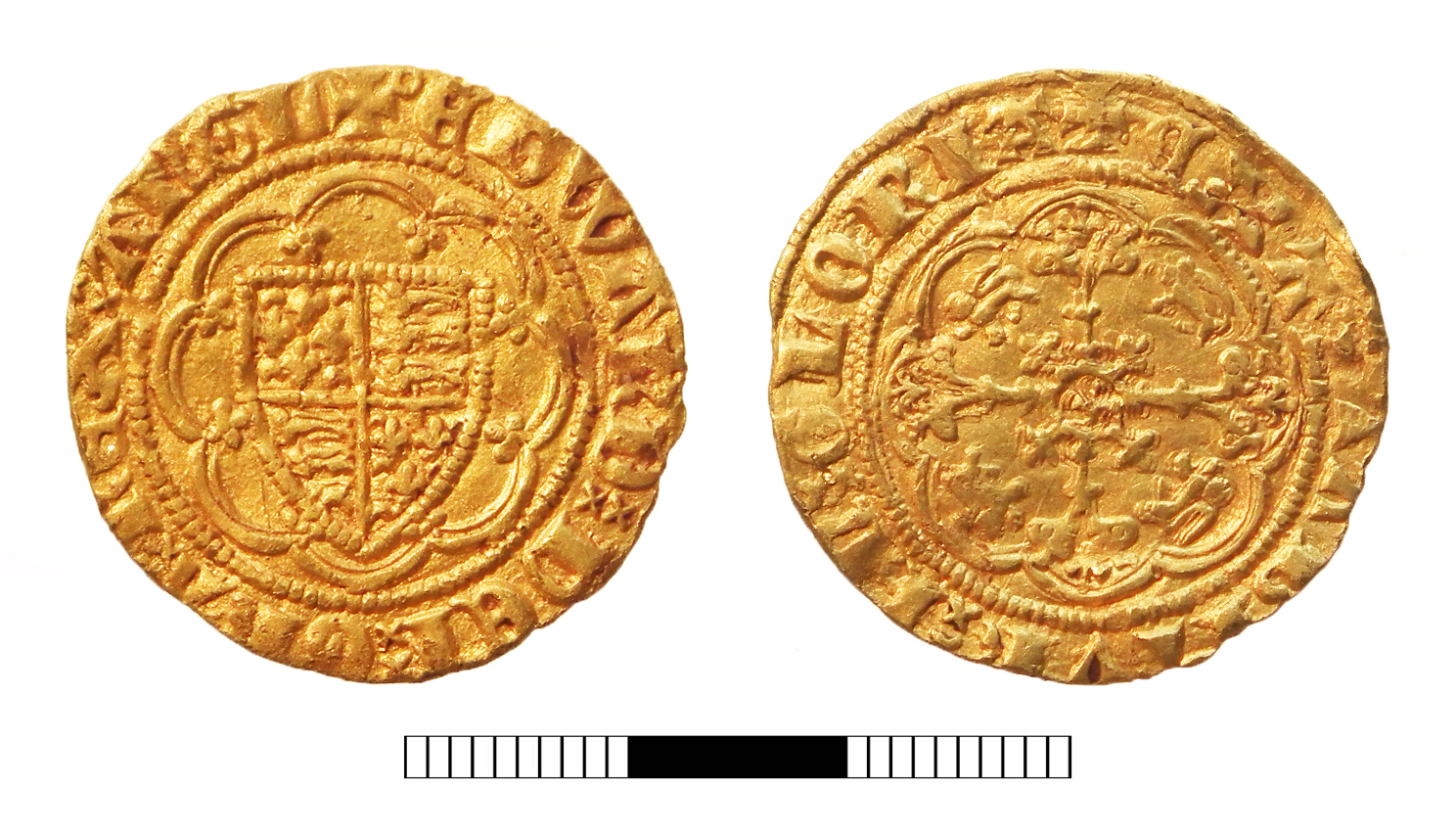
A gold quarter noble of Edward III, found in Beech Hill and dated to 1361–1369

The Camlet Way - the Roman Road which runs south-west from Verulamium, modern St. Albans - joins the Devil's Highway at Fair Cross on Beech Hill's southern border and continues on westward to Calleva Atrebatum, modern Silchester. On the Beech Hill side is The Priory, a 17th-century house on the site of Stratfield Saye Priory which was founded on the site of an old hermitage in 1170 and dissolved in 1399. Beech Hill House, of 1720, stands on the eastern side of the village. It is a Grade II listed building. Trunkwell House, on the west side, was originally the Tudor home of the Noyes family, the current English country house at Trunkwell was built in 1878 for a successful local business family and is now a hotel and restaurant. It is associated with the local pub, The Elm Tree Inn. The Church of England parish church of St Mary the Virgin was built in 1867 by William Butterfield and is Grade II* listed.

== Transport ==
The nearest railway station is Mortimer, 1.7 miles (2.7 km) east of the village, with services to Reading and Basingstoke.

== Governance ==
Beech Hill was originally part of the parish of Stratfield Saye, a cross-county-border parish, most of which was in Hampshire. The part in Berkshire became a civil parish in its own right in 1894. In the 16th century, it was part of the hundred of Theale, but was later transferred to the hundred of Reading which effectively ceased to function after 1886. By 1875, Beech Hill had become part of the Bradfield rural sanitary district which, in 1894, became the Bradfield Rural District. From 1974 to 1998, it was part of the district of Newbury which is now the West Berkshire unitary authority. It is represented at Westminster by the MP for Wokingham.

== Demography ==
2011 Published Statistics: Population, home ownership and extracts from Physical Environment, surveyed in 2005
| Output area | Homes owned outright | Owned with a loan | Socially rented | Privately rented | Other | km^{2} roads | km^{2} water | km^{2} domestic gardens | Usual residents | km^{2} |
|---|---|---|---|---|---|---|---|---|---|---|
| Civil parish | 48 | 41 | 15 | 22 | 1 | 0.1 | 0.02 | 0.1 | 294 | 4.70 |

== See also ==
- List of civil parishes in Berkshire
