= Padworth Common Local Nature Reserve =

Nature reserve in Berkshire, England

Coordinates: 51°22′39″N 1°06′40″W

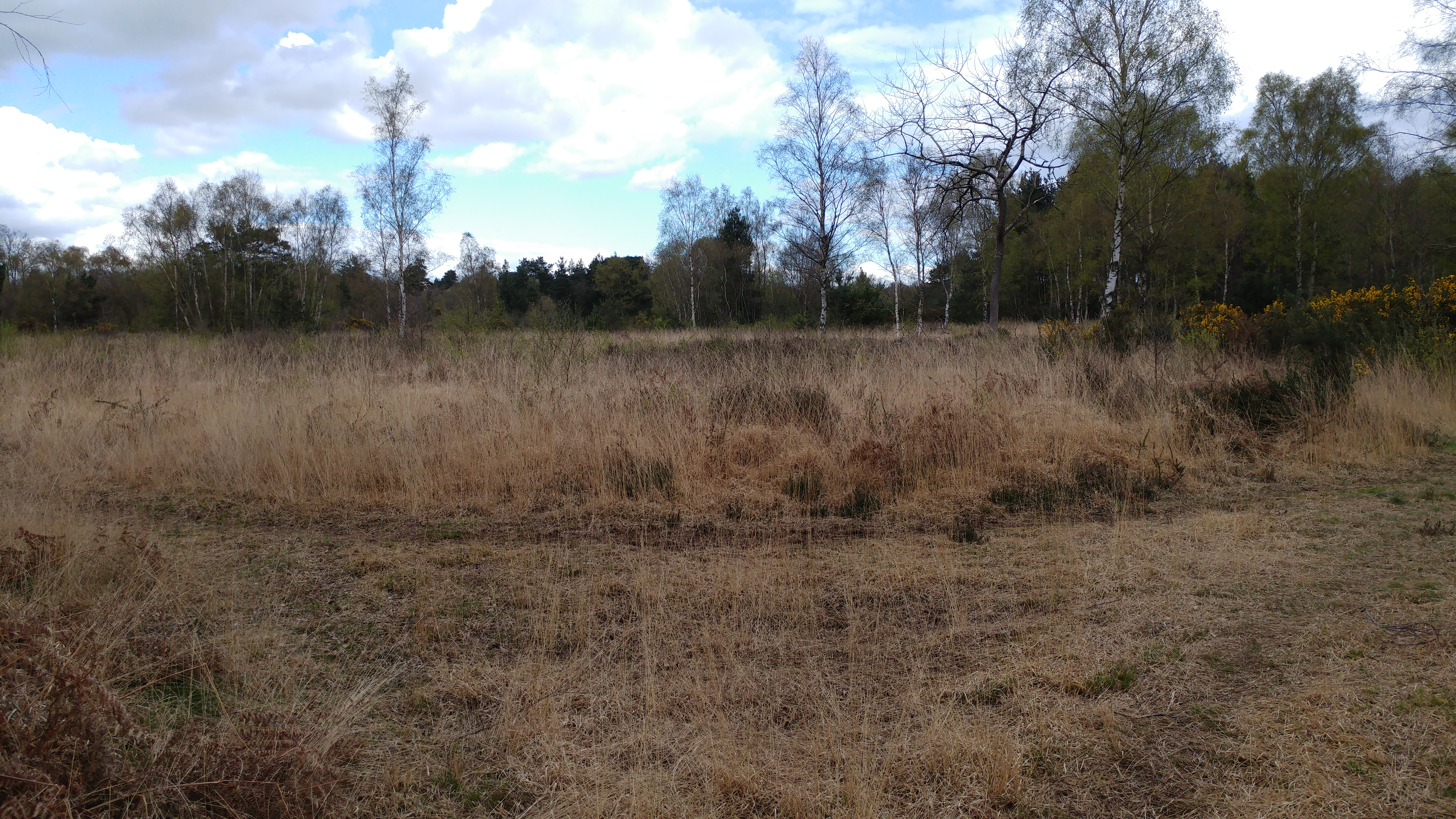
- Interactive map of Padworth Common Local Nature Reserve
- Type: Local Nature Reserve
- Location: Padworth Common, Berkshire
- OS grid: SU 619 646
- Area: 28 hectares (69 acres)
- Manager: Berkshire, Buckinghamshire and Oxfordshire Wildlife Trust

Padworth Common Local Nature Reserve is a 28-hectare (69-acre) Local Nature Reserve on the edge of the hamlet of Padworth Common, between Reading and Newbury in Berkshire. It is owned by West Berkshire Council and managed by Berkshire, Buckinghamshire and Oxfordshire Wildlife Trust.

== Geography and site ==
The site is served by a network of paths that run through a variety of habitats, including heathland, woodland, ponds and wet alder-lined gullies. The woodland is based in the north of the site, with heathland in the south.

== History ==
Padworth Common was given its nature reserve status in 2005 by Newbury District Council.

In 2013 the management of the nature reserve was transferred from West Berkshire Council to the Berkshire, Buckinghamshire and Oxfordshire Wildlife Trust.

== Fauna ==
The site has the following fauna:

=== Reptiles and amphibians ===
- Vipera berus
- Grass snake
- Anguis fragilis
- Common frog
- Common toad
- Palmate newt
- Smooth newt

=== Invertebrates ===
- Grayling
- Cicindela campestris
- Bog bush-cricket
- Golden-ringed dragonfly
- Downy emerald
- Common hawker
- Purple hairstreak
- Limenitis camilla

=== Birds ===
- European nightjar
- Dartford warbler
- Tree pipit
- European stonechat
- Woodlark
- European green woodpecker
- Eurasian siskin
- Goldcrest
- Little grebe
- Moorhen
- Common buzzard
- Woodcock
- Tawny owl
- Little owl
- Eurasian treecreeper
- Eurasian nuthatch
- Hobby
- Willow warbler
- Garden warbler
- Common whitethroat
- Common chiffchaff
- Eurasian blackcap
- Common firecrest
- Spotted flycatcher
- Redwing
- Fieldfare
- Lesser redpoll
