= Padworth Common =

Hamlet in Berkshire, England

Coordinates: 51.379883°N 1.109467°W

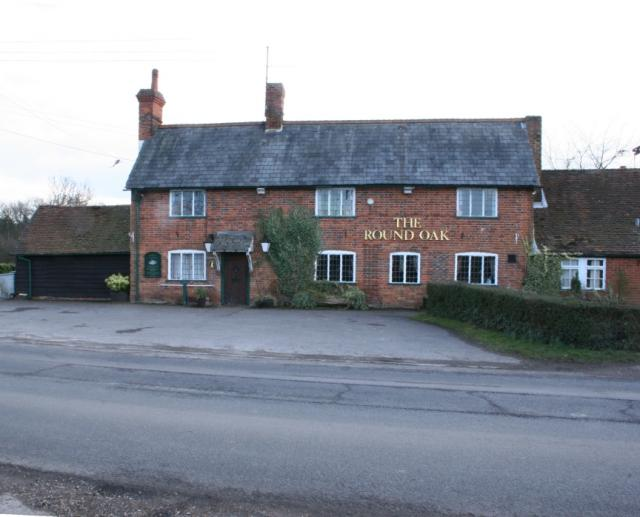
- The Round Oak pub, Padworth Common

- Location within Berkshire
- OS grid reference: SU624649
- Unitary authority: West Berkshire
- Ceremonial county: Berkshire
- Region: South East
- Country: England
- Sovereign state: United Kingdom
- Post town: READING
- Postcode district: RG7
- Dialling code: 0118
- Police: Thames Valley
- Fire: Royal Berkshire
- Ambulance: South Central
- UK Parliament: Reading West and Mid Berkshire

Padworth Common is a hamlet and common in the English county of Berkshire, within the civil parish of Padworth. It is bounded by Burghfield to the east and Aldermaston to the west. To the north is Padworth and to the south is Mortimer West End.

== Geography ==
On the southern edge of Padworth Common is the 28-hectare Padworth Common Local Nature Reserve.
