= Stratfield Saye Priory =

Priory in Beech Hill, Berkshire, England

Coordinates: 51.374315°N 0.984226°W

Stratfield Saye Priory was an alien priory belonging to the Abbey of Vallemont, located at Beech Hill in the Berkshire part of the parish of Stratfield Saye (in England).

It was established in 1169 or 1170 and dissolved in 1399. The site is occupied by an 18th-century house called The Priory.
