= Decoy Pit, Pools and Woods =

Protected area in Berkshire, England

- Site of Special Scientific Interest
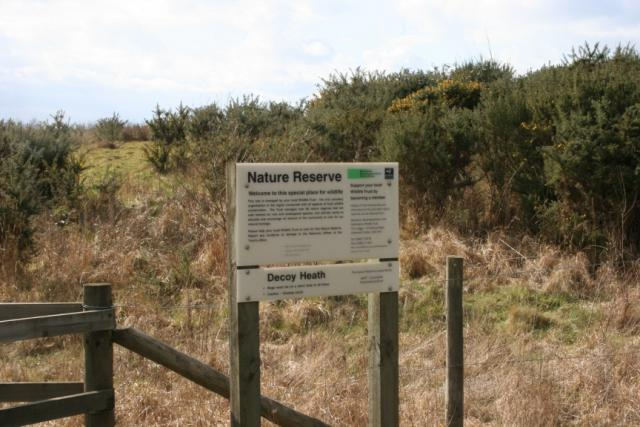

- Location within Berkshire
- Location of Decoy Pit, Pools and Woods.
- Area of search: Berkshire
- Grid reference: SU 611 632
- Coordinates: 51.365°N 1.124°W
- Interest: Biological
- Area: 17.7 hectares (44 acres)
- Notification date: 1993
- Location map: Magic Map

Decoy Pit, Pools and Woods is a 17.7-hectare (44-acre) biological Site of Special Scientific Interest south of Aldermaston in Berkshire. An area of 8 hectares (20 acres) is a nature reserve called Decoy Heath, which is managed by the Berkshire, Buckinghamshire and Oxfordshire Wildlife Trust.

== Site ==
The site comprises several habitats including woodland, heathland, grassland and small waterbodies, and includes alder woodland types which are becoming a declining habitat in England. The site also supports the greatest known number of breeding dragonfly and damselfly species in Berkshire, whilst the presence of many other common, and some rare, insect and bird species also adds to the diversity and value of the site.

In the southern part of the site the land slopes gently eastwards within a draining gully system; the head of the stream West End Brook flows through here. On the northern part of the site a former gravel pit, now partially infilled after it was abandoned in the early 1980s, has developed into a mosaic of shallow pools, also supporting a large pond, some heathland and scrub. The area supports many wetland plants including bulrush Typha latifolia, common spike-rush Eleocharis palustris, as well as a locally scarce species marsh speedwell Veronica scutellata. The heathland and scrub areas are predominantly populated by heather Calluna vulgaris and are slowly being colonised by birch. Surrounding land comprises typically of secondary birch woodland with some heathland. There is also a small valley bog where purple moor-grass Molinia caerulea is particularly abundant.

Ancient semi-natural woodland occurs in the areas known locally as Brick kiln Gully, Roundwood Gully and Roundwood Copse. The low-lying gullies here are permanently waterlogged and support alder woodland. The ground flora is diverse and includes greater tussock-sedge Carex paniculata and opposite-leaved goldensaxifrage Chrysosplenium oppositifolium.

Other more commonly occurring woodland types are represented within the SSSI, associated with the middle and upper slopes of the gullies. These areas contain species typical for semi-natural ancient woodland including hard shield-fern (Polystichum aculeatum) and Solomon's-seal (Polygonatum multiflorum). A well vegetated pond is located on the north side of Best Gully.

Twenty-three species of dragonfly and damselfly breed within the site. The ponds, streams and shallow pools are used for breeding whilst valuable feeding habitat is provided in the adjacent woodland. Three nationally scarce species are present; the scarce blue-tailed damselfly (Ischnura pumilio), a species known to prefer shallow, newly created pools; the downy emerald (Cordulia aenea) and the brilliant emerald (Somatochlora metallica).

The site is associated with a range of rare fauna, including woodlark and the silverstudded blue butterfly (Plebejus argus), both of which breed in the heathland area. The site is also home to the Devon carpet moth (Lampropteryx otregiata), which may be found only on this site within the whole of Berkshire; also the snipe and jack snipe visit the pools in winter, whilst siskins and redpolls have been recorded feeding in the alders.
