= Three Mile Cross =

Village in Berkshire, England

Coordinates: 51.4074°N 0.9738°W

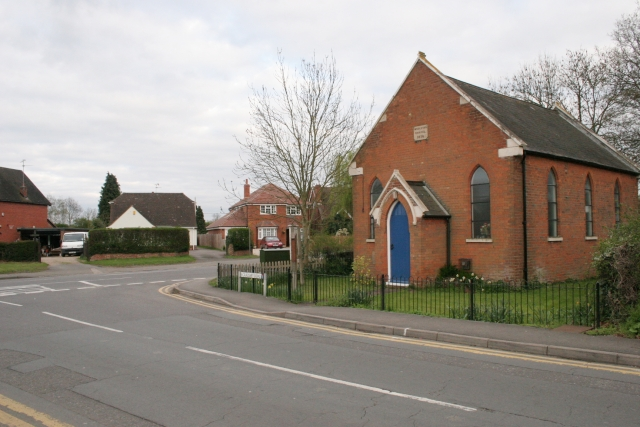
- The Wesleyan Chapel, dated 1876, Three Mile Cross

- Location within Berkshire
- Civil parish: Shinfield
- Unitary authority: Wokingham
- Ceremonial county: Berkshire
- Region: South East
- Country: England
- Sovereign state: United Kingdom
- Post town: Reading
- Postcode district: RG7
- Dialling code: 0118
- Police: Thames Valley
- Fire: Royal Berkshire
- Ambulance: South Central
- UK Parliament: Wokingham

Three Mile Cross is a village in the Borough of Wokingham, Berkshire, England. It's around 3 miles (4.8 km) to the south of Reading town centre, giving it its name. Along with the adjoining village of Spencers Wood to the south and Mereoak to the north, it forms a part of the civil parish of Shinfield.

In the 1960s, the M4 Motorway was built and became an artificial barrier between the village and Reading. In the 1980s, the A33 Swallowfield Bypass severed roads to the Estate of Mereoak park lying in the Reading direction.

== History ==
Three Mile Cross is best known as the home of the famous 19th-century author, Mary Russell Mitford who wrote a five-volume book of literary sketches entitled Our Village, which is a series of stories and essays largely about the setting and people of Three Mile Cross. Just to the north-west of the village is the area of five manors called Hartley. During the 13th century, the college of St Nicholas de Vaux in Salisbury was Lord of the manor of Hartley Dummer. At the Dissolution of the Monasteries, Henry VIII granted this manor for purchase by Sir John Williams (later Lord Williams of Thame). After his death in 1559, his possessions were passed to his daughters. Through various sales and transfers, other major landowners declaring ownership of the area in their title deeds include the Norreyses of Rycote, the Earls of Abingdon, the Jameses of Denford and the Benyons of Englefield.

== Business ==
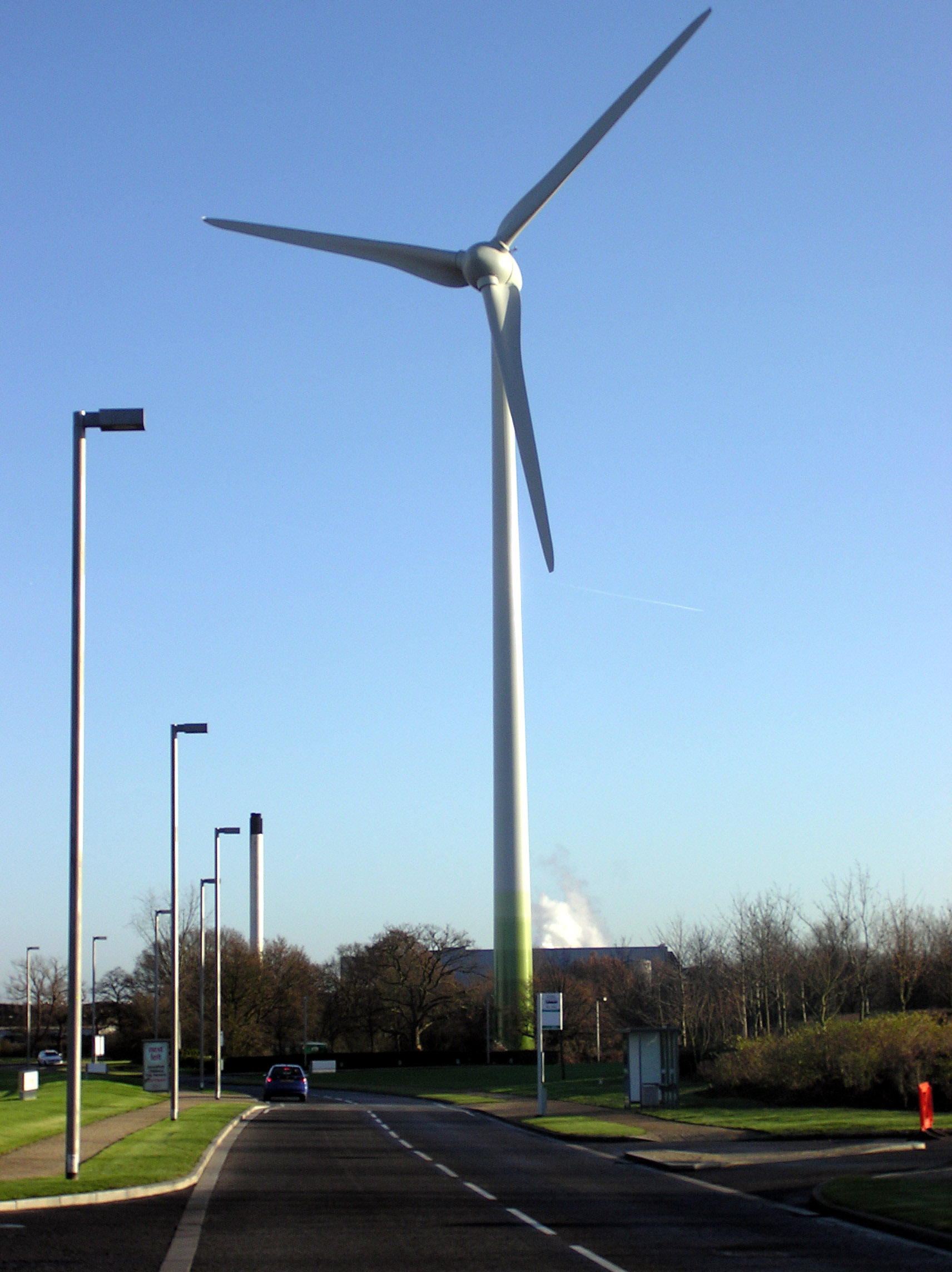
The wind turbine at Hartley near Three Mile Cross

The Green Park Business Park lies half in the Hartley/Three Mile Cross area of Shinfield parish and half in the Smallmead area of Whitley in Reading borough. The 2 megawatt (peak) Enercon wind turbine, near Junction 11 of the M4, stands in Shinfield. It has been described as "the UK's most visible turbine". It was constructed in November 2005 and is owned by Ecotricity. The blades are 33 metres (108 ft) long, with a tower height of 85 metres (279 ft). At a wind speed of 14 m/s (31 mph) the machine generates 2.05 MW of electricity (less for lower wind speeds) and has the potential to produce 3.5 million units of electricity a year, enough to power 1,063 local homes.

The Courage Berkshire Brewery, built in 1978, was also half within Shinfield. It was demolished in 2011.
