= Alfred Palmer (businessman) =

English businessman (1852–1936)

Alfred Palmer (1852-1936) was a member of the Palmer family, proprietors of the Huntley & Palmers biscuit manufacturers of Reading in England.

He was born in Reading, the son of George Palmer and his wife, Elizabeth Sarah, the daughter of Robert Meteyard.

Palmer spent over fifty years working for the Huntley & Palmers biscuit company, chiefly as the head of the engineering department where he was responsible for the building and maintenance of the biscuit machinery. He also served as a director of the company.

Besides his business involvement, Palmer was a significant benefactor of the University of Reading, and held the position in 1905 of High Sheriff of Berkshire.

== Wokefield ==
His country estate was at Wokefield Park in Stratfield Mortimer. By 1901, Palmer was “Lord of the Manor”. This status continued through the 1920s, and until his death. Palmer was an award winning breeder of Galloway cattle at Wokefield.

Palmer purchased the property in 1901, then at his death, it was sold in 1936 to the De La Salle Catholic Brothers for use as a school.
