= Foudry Brook =

River in Hampshire and Berkshire, England

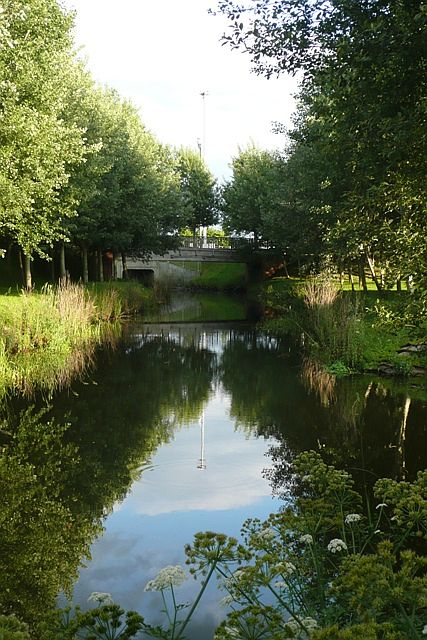
- Foudry Brook near Whitley, Berkshire

Location
- Country: England
- Counties: Hampshire, Berkshire
- Towns: Reading, Whitley, Baughurst, Tadley, Stratfield Mortimer

Physical characteristics
- Source
  - location: Baughurst, Hampshire, United Kingdom
  - coordinates: 51.333249°N 1.162603°W
  - elevation: 93 m (305 ft)
- Mouth: River Kennet
  - location: Whitley, near Reading, Berkshire, United Kingdom
  - coordinates: 51.43511°N 0.977381°W
  - elevation: 40 m (130 ft)

Basin features
- Tributaries
  - left: Beaumonts Stream or Brook, Bishop's Wood Stream, West End Brook, near Mortimer, Burghfield Brook (Lockram Brook)

Foudry Brook is a small stream in southern England. It rises from a number of springs near the Hampshire village of Baughurst, and flows to the east and then the north, to join the River Kennet to the south of Reading. The upper section is called Silchester Brook, and beyond that, Bishop's Wood Stream. The underlying geology is chalk, covered by a layer of clay, and so it has the characteristics of a clay stream, experiencing rapid increases in level after heavy rain due to run-off from the surrounding land. It passes a number of listed buildings and scheduled monuments, including the site of the Roman town of Calleva Atrebatum or Silchester.

The natural flow of the river is supplemented by treated effluent from two major sewage treatment works, which contribute to the poor quality of the water. Water quality is also affected by physical modification of the channel, which restricts the free movement of fish around the system.

== Route ==
Foudry Brook rises at springs between the small villages of Heath End and Baughurst, where it is known as Bishop's Wood Stream. It flows eastwards though Tadley, and is briefly culverted under housing on Elmhurst before emerging back on the surface and passing under the A340 Mulfords Hill road. It then enters a much longer culvert under Tadley Bottom, and emerges into open countryside on the east side of Bowmonts Bridge. It crosses the Pamber Forest nature reserve, becoming the Silchester Brook, and turns to the south, where Silchester Sewage Treatment Works is on the right bank. It then passes between two earthworks before Honeymill Brook joins it on the right bank. The linear earthworks were associated with a Late Iron Age town that developed into the Roman town called Calleva or Silchester. They are 1,070 feet (326 m) and 900 feet (274 m) long, with a gap of 230 feet (70 m) where the river passes through.

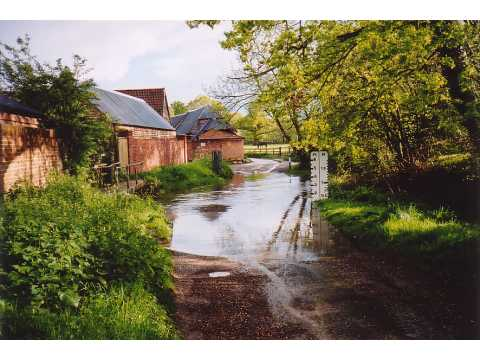
A ford across Foudry Brook at Clapper's Farm, near Silchester

Honeymill Brook rises at a pond near Browninghill Green, to the south of Baughurst, and at a series of springs to the east of the village near Church Brook Farm. The two sources join near Church Road, Tadley and flow eastwards to Honey Mill Bridge, which carries the A340 Aldermaston Road over the brook. The course of the Port Way Roman road also crosses at this point on the western boundary of Pamber Forest. On the far side of the woodland, it runs parallel to the earthworks and joins Silchester Brook as it turns to the east again. At Park Copse, higher ground prevents further progress to the east, and as turns to the north, it passes a moated site consists of a raised square platform, some 82 feet (25 m) square, surrounded by a stream-fed moat and some fishponds. The outflow from the moat joins Silchester Brook at Clapper's Farm. The Reading to Basingstoke railway follows the valley northwards, running alongside the river.

A little further to the north, the course of the Devil's Highway crosses the river, a Roman road that ran from London to Silchester. It turns to the north-east, and is joined by the West End Brook on its left bank, as it crosses into Berkshire. West End Brook rises close to the source of the Silchester Brook, but a little further to the north, and runs eastwards to reach the confluence. At the county boundary, it becomes the Foudry Brook, and at Stratfield Mortimer it passes close to the grade II listed St Mary's Church building, designed in 1869 by Richard Armstrong, but containing stained glass from the 15th and 17th centuries, as well as a Saxon stone coffin lid for Aegelwardus, who died in 1017. On the right bank opposite the church building is a long linear fishpond. The river drops over a waterfall, which was originally part of a hydraulic ram, and provided water from the river to Manor House. This was also the location of a medieval watermill, and the straight course of the river below the waterfall may be due to the fact that it was built to return water from the mill to the river. A mill was recorded in the manor of Stratfield Mortimer when the Domesday Book was compiled in 1086, and there is documentary evidence for a mill in 1304 and again in 1449–50, but nothing subsequently. Tun Bridge carries Station Road to the nearby grade II* listed Mortimer railway station, built by Isambard Kingdom Brunel in 1848, and notable because it is one of a small number of his wayside station buildings that have remained virtually unaltered since their construction.

After passing Stratfield Mortimer Sewage Treatment Works on its left bank, the river turns to the east near Wokefield Park Training Centre, passing under the railway line, which continues northwards. Missels Bridge carries Cross Lane over the river before it passes another Clappers Farm, this one with a farmhouse dating from the 16th century with 19th century alterations. Reid's Bridge carries the drive for Brook Farm, after which a ridge of higher ground separates the valley from that of the River Loddon, and so the river turns to the north. The hamlet of Lambwoodhill Common is on the left bank, with Foudry Bridge to the south and Gravelly Bridge to the north. Just before it reaches the M4 motorway Burghfield Brook joins on its left bank, and after the bridge, the stream passes between the Green Park Business Park and the Madejski Stadium and football centre west of Whitley, where it provides the water for the meadow-landscaped lakes. It then passes under a large roundabout on the A33 road, carries on between Thames Water's Reading sewage treatment works to the west and Kennet Island to the east, before discharging into the River Kennet, here canalised as part of the Kennet and Avon Canal, just downstream of Fobney Lock and Bridge 8A, which carries the A33 over the Kennet. The Kennet weaves its way through Reading passing through County Lock and Blake's Lock to join the River Thames downstream of Caversham Lock.

== Geology and hydrogeology ==
Chalk is the major aquifer in the catchment area of the River Kennet and its tributaries, including the Foudry Brook. Whereas the chalk is on the surface in the west of the catchment, it is covered by a layer of clay and sand to the east, where the Foudry Brook is located. This gives it the typical characteristics of a clay catchment river, where the flow rates can be quite variable, with the low base flow rising rapidly after heavy rainfall, as surface water cannot pass through the impermeable clay, and quickly finds its way into the river.

== Ecology ==
In 2004, Foudry Brook had a grade of ‘c’ to ‘d’ on the Environment Agency General Quality Assessment (GQA) scheme for biological and chemical quality (with ‘a’ being the highest quality and grade ‘f’ the lowest). This was thought to be a result of the discharge of treated effluent into the lower reaches from sewage treatment works.

The GQA scheme has since been replaced as a way of recording the water quality of the river systems in England. Each is given an overall ecological status, which may be one of five levels: high, good, moderate, poor or bad. There are several components that are used to determine this, including biological status, which looks at the quantity and varieties of invertebrates, angiosperms and fish. Chemical status, which compares the concentrations of various chemicals against known safe concentrations, is rated good or fail.

The water quality of the Foudry Brook system was as follows in 2019.

Section	Ecological Status	Chemical Status	Overall Status	Length	Catchment
Silchester Brook	Moderate	Fail	Moderate	6.9 miles (11.1 km)	8.94 square miles (23.2 km^{2})
West End Brook (tributary of Foudry Brook)	Poor	Fail	Poor	1.1 miles (1.8 km)	4.27 square miles (11.1 km^{2})
Burghfield Brook	Moderate	Fail	Moderate	4.2 miles (6.8 km)	7.02 square miles (18.2 km^{2})
Foudry Brook (West End Brook to M4)	Poor	Fail	Poor	7.7 miles (12.4 km)	9.08 square miles (23.5 km^{2})

Water quality on Silchester Brook has improved from poor in 2015 to moderate in 2016. Most of the reasons for it not achieving good quality are connected with sewage discharge. West End Brook dropped from moderate to bad in 2015, and the reasons for it not being good are mainly to do with physical modification of the channel, which prevents fish freely moving around the system, and the presence of the invasive species, the North American signal crayfish. Burghfield Brook is affected by discharges from industry, and the main factors affecting the Foudry Brook are physical modification of the channel and sewage discharge.

The brook is prone to flooding along its length, which has caused the most problems on the outskirts of Whitley, where its water voles hinder raising banks and expansion of water-meadows.

== Pollution ==
In an action brought by the Environment Agency in 2002, Total Fina Elf UK Ltd was fined £54,000 for causing petrol to enter groundwater and a tributary of the Foudry Brook, from its service station in Tadley. Between January 1999 and March 2001 from 2,000 up to 10,000 litres seeped into the ground from leaks in an underground petrol tank, and from filler and suction lines.

In July 2010 a serious leak from sewage works into the Brook near Silchester killed hundreds of fish and many other organisms on a three-mile stretch.

In 2025, Thames Water recorded 14 sewage spills into the Foudry Brook totalling 168.5 hours, a figure which is nearly double their own stated long-term average of 8 spills per year.

== Bibliography ==
- CAMS (May 2004). "The Kennet and Pang Catchment Abstraction Management Strategy" (PDF). Environment Agency. Archived from the original (PDF) on 9 August 2011.
- Ditchfield, P H; Page, William, eds. (1923). "Parishes: Stratfield Mortimer". A History of the County of Hampshire. Vol. 3. British History Online. pp. 422–428.
- Fort, Linda (2 October 2008). "Feeling ratty over flood work delays in Whitley Wood". getreading. Archived from the original on 16 August 2017.
- Gregory, Chris (14 August 2010). "Brook 'slowly recovering' after deadly sewage leak". Southern Daily Echo. Archived from the original on 16 August 2017.
- Mortimer, Local History Group (July 2018). "Walk 1: Stratfield Mortimer" (PDF). Mortimer Heritage Trail. Stratfield Mortimer Parish Council. Archived (PDF) from the original on 14 July 2020.
- Nicholson (2006). Nicholson Guides Vol 7: River Thames and the Southern Waterways. Harper Collins. ISBN 978-0-00-721115-9.
