= Beaumys Castle =

14th-century manor house in Swallowfield, UK

- Swallowfield, Berkshire, England

Site information
- Type: Fortified manor house
- Condition: Earthworks

Location
- Shown within Berkshire
- Location within Berkshire
- Coordinates: 51.3760°N 0.9813°W
- Grid reference: grid reference SU710646

Beaumys Castle, also known as Beams Castle, was a 14th-century fortified manor house in the parish of Swallowfield in the English county of Berkshire.

== History ==
Beaumys Castle was a manor in the parish of Swallowfied, given to Sir Nicholas de la Beche in 1335. De la Beche received a licence to crenellate in 1338 and produced a fortified manor house. The castle was rectangular, protected by earthworks approximately 130m by 110m across, surrounded by a water-filled moat, with the castle accessed from an entrance to the north-west.

De la Beche died, leaving the manor to his wife Margery, who in turn remarried, to Thomas Arderne. On Arderne's death in 1347, however, John de Dalton and a small group of followers broke into the castle, where they killed Michael de Poynings, an important nobleman; terrified Lionel, the son of Edward III who was staying there at the time; stole £1,000 worth of goods, and seized Margaret, who, as a wealthy widow, was forced to marry John.

The surrounding manor was broken up in 1420; the surviving earthworks are a scheduled monument.

== See also ==
- Castles in Great Britain and Ireland
- List of castles in England

== Bibliography ==
- MacKenzie, James Dixon. (1896/2009) The Castles of England: Their Story and Structure. General Books LLC. ISBN 978-1-150-51044-1.
