= Wokefield Park =

18th-century country house in Berkshire, England

De Vere Wokefield Estate
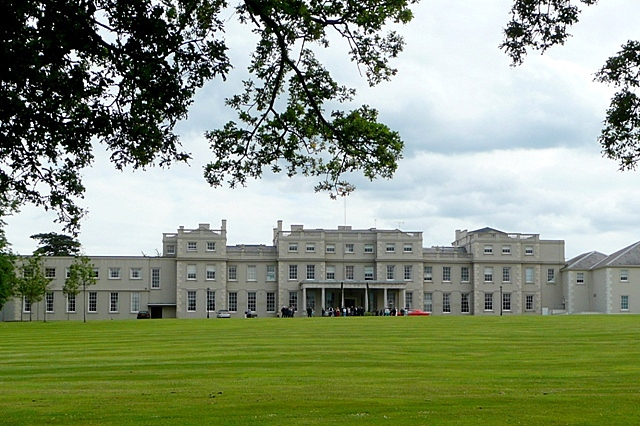
- Wokefield Park in 2009

- Location within Berkshire

General information
- Location: Goodboys Lane; Mortimer; Reading, Berkshire; RG7 3AE
- Coordinates: 51°23′10″N 1°2′0″W
- Year built: Early 18th century
- Renovated: Early 19th century (added) c. 1900 (refaced and added); Mid-20th century (added)

Design and construction
- Architect: Sir John Soane

Website
- www.phcompany.com/de-vere/wokefield-estate/

Listed Building – Grade II*
- Official name: St Benedict's School Wokefield Park
- Designated: 14 April 1967
- Reference no.: 1135957

Wokefield Park is an 18th-century country house, situated in the parish of Wokefield, near Mortimer, in the English county of Berkshire. It is currently run as an events venue.

== History ==
Wokefield park was first mentioned in 1319 as a deer park.

=== 16th–18th century ===
The first house at Wokefield was built in the 1560s for Edmund Plowden; it is likely that the present vaulted cellars date from this time. At this time the house was alternatively known as Oakfield Park. The estate passed through the Plowden family until Edmund's grandson Francis sold it to the Weaver family in 1627. Through marriage, the estate passed from the Weaver family to the Pearces (in the late 17th century) then to the Parry family (in the early 18th century). Charles Parry rebuilt the house in the 1720s in a similar design to that of Kinlet Hall in Shropshire. Parry's house is the current mansion.

Wokefield Park was sold in 1742 to Henry Paget, 1st Earl of Uxbridge. The Earl's grandson, Henry Paget, 2nd Earl of Uxbridge, inherited the estate before selling it to Bernard Brocas (of nearby Beaurepaire) before the latter's death in 1777. Around this time, John Rocque's map of Berkshire shows that the estate was landscaped with avenues, woodland and water.

=== 19th–20th century ===
At the request of the Brocas family, Sir John Soane made alterations in the early 19th century onwards. In 1839 the estate was put up for sale after the death of Bernard Brocas's grandson, also named Bernard.

The house and grounds were purchased by Robert Allfrey (1809–75) who had inherited his fortune from his father's stake in the Meux and Reid Brewery in London. Upon Allfrey's death in 1875, his £400,000 estate (equivalent to £39,905,000 in 2025) passed through the family until it was sold at the turn of the century to Alfred Palmer of Huntley & Palmers. Palmer undertook a complete renovations of the house's interior, adding Adamesque plasterwork and a wooden staircase screened by Ionic columns.

In 1936 the house was sold to the De La Salle brothers and put to use as St. Benedict's Approved School, operating as such until the 1970s.

In 1984 the property (still called St Benedict's was sold by the then owners, the London Borough of Brent, following an article in the London Evening Standard exposing the low occupancy and high operating loss. The mansion and 35 acres (14 ha) were acquired by Style Conferences Limited, then the leading corporate training centre operator in the UK. The main mansion house was converted into a 60-bed conference and hospitality venue for Style by Wiltshier Construction originally to meet a contract for British Telecom plc. Following a dispute linked to the authority secured within BT, the contract was cancelled. The construction was completed and the training centre opened in April 1986. Subsequently, the remaining outbuildings were converted to provide a further 41 en suite bedrooms and the training facility for ICL plc and Barclays Bank plc. By 1990 the site was taken up primarily by Rank Xerox having relocated their training centre from Newport Pagnell – Harben House.

In the early 1990s, the farm site and a further 140 acres (57 ha) were acquired from Mr John Carnell and this was redeveloped to form the 150 bed Executive Centre. This was initially developed for KPMG, Oracle Corporation and others. The business traded in the leisure sector at weekends supported by the Golf Course and indoor leisure facilities and outdoor pursuits.

The Executive Centre was designed by Tony Herring Associates and constructed by Potton Developments based upon concepts that Style had researched in the US and Europe in partnership with Cornell University (Prof. Dick Penner). The building elements were constructed using three different methods (podded timber framed bedrooms encased in a brick shell, industrial space frame construction for meeting areas for future spatial flexibility and traditional methods for public areas and leisure). This allowed a very rapid construction period – 12 months – and tight budgetary control. The project won a number of construction sector awards. Investment had reached £22 million on the site yet the company chose to turn down an offer of £45 million from a hospitality plc based upon its profitability.

In 1998 the buildings adjacent to the mansion and 1960s extensions were demolished and redeveloped to provide a better training facility for Rank Xerox and a new purpose-built training and sales development centre for BMW (GB) Limited.

=== 21st century ===
By 2002 the property was generating annual sales of over £24 million and was a very successful business but by then the Style Conferences business had been acquired firstly by BET plc (1994) and shortly after by Rentokil Initial plc (1996). The capital intensive conferencing company was a poor commercial fit in the RI group and following 15 years of 25% year-on-year profitability growth the company, then Initial Style was sold to a heavily geared private syndicate. The new owners pursued a more hotel-orientated sales strategy linked to their purchase of De Vere Hotels, which proved problematic in the subsequent recession. After further restructuring and ownership change, the property is now held by Principal Hayley/Starwood Capital.

In 2015 the Executive Centre building was substantially damaged by fire. The fire affected around 100 of the hotel's 222 rooms, though the fire was contained within a newer part of the complex rather than the historic house.

== Architecture ==
The house was designated a Grade II* listed building in 1967.

The building's two façades are the north-facing entrance front and the south-facing garden front. The main building is focused around a three-storey central block with seven bays. This is connected on either side by three-bay, two-storey wings and abutted by two-wing, three-storey blocks. Upon the wings are balustraded parapets featuring urns on the two-storey sections. Across the façade, the first storey is topped by a frieze and cornice, and the corners of the building feature plinths and rusticated quoins. The entrance front features a porte-cochère with fluted columns and triglyph frieze. In comparison, the garden front features a smaller projecting porch with Doric pilasters supporting a triangular pediment.

Within the building is a black and white flagstone floor and extensive wooden panelling. Examples of Doric, Ionic, and Corinthian architecture is featured around the building's interior.

== Events venue ==
Wokefield Park is currently operated as a corporate event and wedding venue. It is owned by Starwood Capital and operates under its De Vere Venues portfolio. The complex has 222 bedrooms and 30 suites for conferences. Adjacent to the mansion house is a training centre for BMW. The park has an 18-hole golf course with driving range, constructed in 1996. The mansion house building houses a small gym, with a larger gym, swimming pool, and sauna provided for executive guests. Outdoor activities such as archery, climbing and ropes courses are available.

== See also ==
- Grade II* listed buildings in Berkshire
