= Mortimer railway station =

Railway station in Berkshire, England

Coordinates: 51°22′19.39″N 1°02′08.22″W

Mortimer
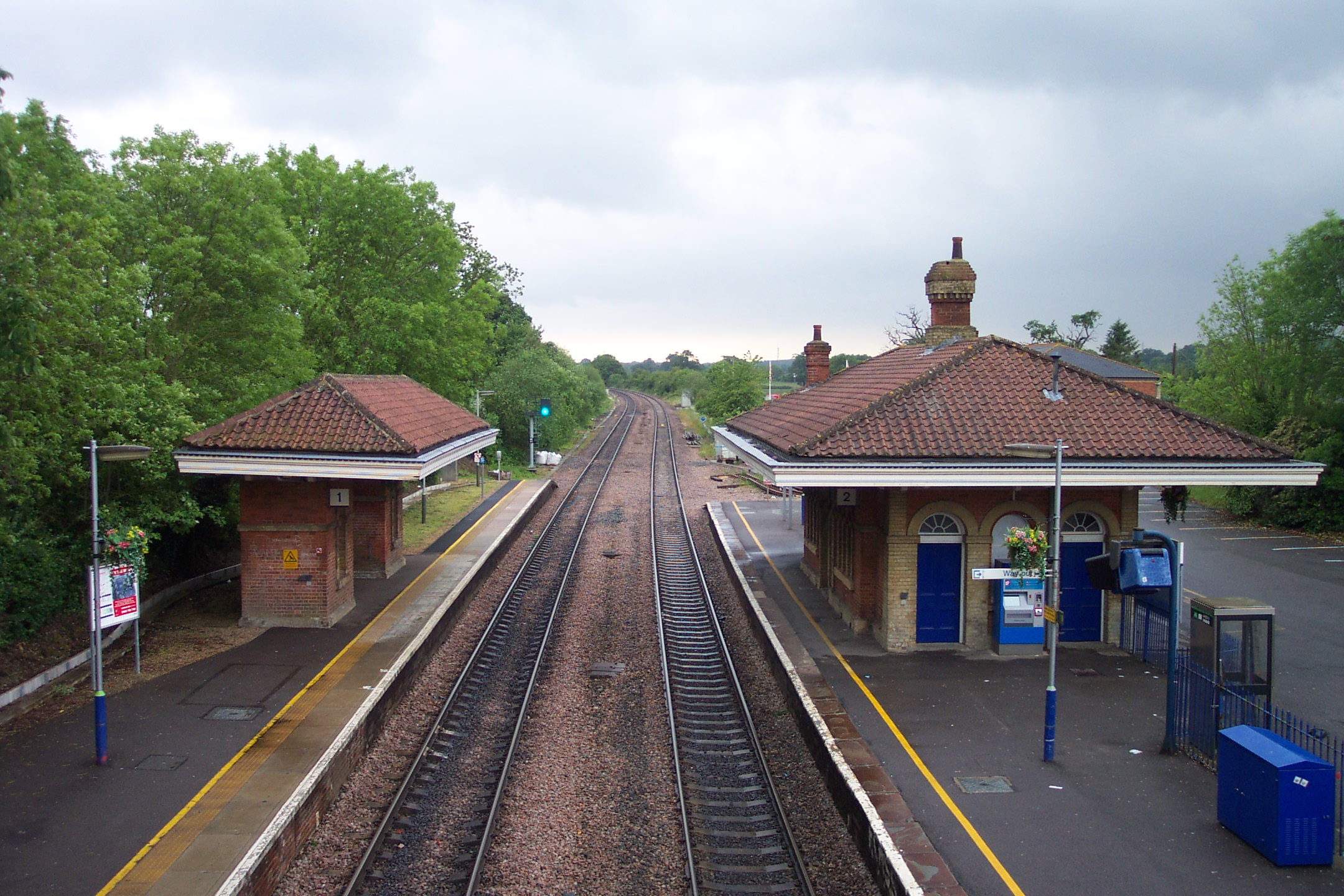
- The station viewed from the footbridge

General information
- Location: Stratfield Mortimer, West Berkshire; England
- Grid reference: SU672641
- Manager: Great Western Railway
- Platforms: 2

Other information
- Station code: MOR
- Classification: DfT category E

History
- Opened: 1 November 1848

Passengers
- 2020/21: ▼36,526
- 2021/22: ▲95,612
- 2022/23: ▲0.121 million
- 2023/24: ▲0.138 million
- 2024/25: ▲0.158 million

Listed Building – Grade II*
- Official name: Mortimer station
- Designated: 4 September 1975
- Reference no.: 1117145

Listed Building – Grade II*
- Official name: Waiting room at Mortimer station on south west side of railway line
- Designated: 28 January 1987
- Reference no.: 1135802
Location
Notes
- Passenger statistics from the Office of Rail and Road

Mortimer railway station serves the village of Stratfield Mortimer, in Berkshire, England. It lies 43 miles 14 chains (69.5 km) from London Paddington. The station is notable for its well-preserved Brunel-designed Great Western Railway (GWR) station buildings, which are still in use. The station is served by local services operated by Great Western Railway.

The station is on the double-tracked Reading to Basingstoke Line and comprises two side platforms linked by a footbridge. Road access is to the north of the station, next to the up (Reading-bound) platform.

The brick-built single-storey main building has a ticket office and waiting room and is on the up platform. The down platform has a matching waiting shelter. Both buildings are Italianate, designed by Brunel for the GWR. They are the only substantially intact survivors of this once-common design, although a much modified example exists at Chepstow. The buildings are Grade II* listed.

== History ==
The station was opened in 1848, along with the Reading to Basingstoke railway line; both it and the station buildings have been in continuous use ever since. The line was promoted by the nominally independent Berks and Hants Railway, but this company was absorbed into the GWR two years before Mortimer station opened. The approval of the Duke of Wellington, who lived nearby at Stratfield Saye House was required for the station's construction.

After railway nationalisation in 1948, operation of the Reading to Basingstoke line, and management of the station, was passed to the Southern Region of British Railways. British Rail (BR) undertook major renovations of the station buildings in time for the celebrations of the 150th anniversary of the GWR, including removing the 1920s slates and replacing them with orange pantiles in the original style.

Following the privatisation of British Rail, the station is again served by trains running under the Great Western Railway name.

== Services ==
All services at Mortimer are operated by Great Western Railway using Class 165 and 166 diesel multiple units.

The typical off-peak service is two trains per hour in each direction between Reading and Basingstoke. On Sundays, the service is reduced to hourly in each direction.

Preceding station	National Rail	Following station
Reading Green Park	Great Western Railway Reading to Basingstoke Line	Bramley

== In popular culture ==
The station appears briefly in the 1974 BBC Doctor Who serial Planet of the Spiders.

== See also ==
- Grade II* listed buildings in Berkshire
