= Mortimer West End =

Village and parish in Hampshire, England

Coordinates: 51.3693°N 1.0914°W

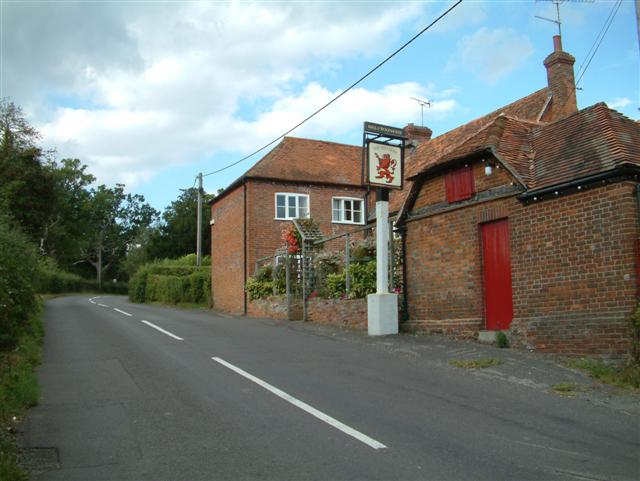
- The Red Lion, Mortimer West End

- Location within Hampshire
- Population: 417 (2011 Census)
- OS grid reference: SU634637
- Shire county: Hampshire
- Region: South East
- Country: England
- Sovereign state: United Kingdom
- Post town: Reading
- Postcode district: RG7
- Police: Hampshire and Isle of Wight
- Fire: Hampshire and Isle of Wight
- Ambulance: South Central
- UK Parliament: North East Hampshire

Mortimer West End is a village and civil parish in north Hampshire in England. It lies in the northernmost point of the county.

== History ==
At one time it was the Hampshire part of the cross-county parish of Stratfield Mortimer (mostly in Berkshire). It became an independent ecclesiastical parish in 1870 - the church of St Saviour having been built in 1854 - and a civil parish in 1894.

The village was traditionally part of the Holdshott Hundred in Hampshire, but was allocated to the vice-county of Berkshire for biological recording purposes in the mid-19th century, eliminating the slight bulge in its border with the vice-county of North Hampshire.

== Amenities ==
The village is served by a public house, the Red Lion, a village hall, St Saviour's church and Mortimer West End chapel.

== Transport ==
There is a village link minibus service which serves Pamber Heath, Silchester and Mortimer West End. It is necessary to pre-book this service by contacting Hampshire County Council.. There is no bus link between Mortimer West End and Mortimer.

== Calleva Atrebatum ==
The village is very close to the site of Calleva Atrebatum which mostly lies in the parish of Silchester. The remains of the town's amphitheatre, however, lie within Mortimer West End, and the Roman road running from Silchester northwards through the village can still be made out in parts. A short stretch of Roman road is still in use in the hamlet of Aldermaston Soke.
