= John Cooper (actor) =

John Cooper (1793–1870), was a British actor active between 1811 and 1859, who played in "a singularly large number of parts, some of them of leading importance" in many locations in England, Wales and Scotland.

== Career ==
=== Early years ===
Cooper was born in Bath in 1793, the son of a tradesman. His first recorded role was as "Alonzo" in E. Young's The Revenge, in a private theatre. He first appeared on the Bath stage on 14 March 1811, aged 18. His first appearance in London was at the Haymarket, on 15 May 1811, as "Count Montalban" in John Tobin's The Honeymoon. He subsequently joined Andrew Cherry and played in a number of Welsh theatres, and in 1812 he played in the north of England and in Scotland. In Edinburgh he played "Edgar" to Edmund Kean's King Lear, and in Glasgow was the first to play the title role in Sheridan Knowles' Virginius.

=== Drury Lane ===
He made his first appearance at Drury Lane in November 1820, as "Romeo", and "was well received". Subsequent roles at Drury Lane included: "Antony" in Julius Caesar, "Tullus Aufidius" in Coriolanus, "Joseph" in The School for Scandal, "Richmond" in Richard III, and "Iago" in Othello.

=== London ===
Around 1825 he married the widowed actress Mrs Dalton, originally Miss Walton, of Dublin, and over the next couple of decades played a large number and variety of parts at Covent Garden, the Haymarket, the English Opera House, and the Surrey Theatre.

=== The Midlands ===
Cooper was also popular and in demand on the York and Lincoln circuits. When his wife died in London in 1843, he moved to Norwich where he was appointed stage-manager. In 1845 moved to Newmarket, and was subsequently engaged by Knowles, the proprietor of the Theatre Royal, Manchester. He made his début there as "Menenius" in Coriolanus. Cooper was also popular in Hull and Leeds.

=== London ===
His final roles were played under Charles Kean at the Princess's Theatre, London, where his performances included "Henry IV" in Henry IV, Part I, the "Duke of York" in Richard II, and "Kent" in King Lear.

== Retirement ==
He retired in 1859, withdrew from the stage, and lived on his savings in Ealing. He subsequently moved to Tunbridge Wells for his health, and died there on 13 July 1870.

== Selected roles ==
- Doge of Venice in Marino Faliero, Doge of Venice by Lord Byron (1821)
- Arsenio in Conscience by James Haynes (1821)
- Cortez in Cortez by James Planché (1823)
- The Hungarian in The Three Strangers by Harriet Lee (1825)
- Dorival in The French Libertine by John Howard Payne (1826)
- Cameron in Forget and Forgive by James Kenney (1827)
- Eudes in Ben Nazir, the Saracen by Thomas Colley Grattan (1827)
- Don Pedro in Don Pedro, King of Castile by Lord Porchester (1828)
- Angelo Colonna in Rienzi by Mary Russell Mitford (1828)
- Don Carlos in The Pledge by James Kenney (1831)
- Guthrum in Alfred the Great by James Sheridan Knowles (1831)
- Lord Marston in The School for Coquettes by Catherine Gore (1831)
- Richard Fitzalan in The Merchant of London by Thomas James Serle (1832)
- Prince of Eisbach in The House of Colberg by Thomas James Serle (1832)
- Edward in The Daughter by James Sheridan Knowles (1836)
