= Alfred the Great (disambiguation) =

Alfred the Great (c. 849–899) was an English king.

Alfred the Great may also refer to:

- Alfred the Great (play), an 1831 play by James Sheridan Knowles
- Alfred the Great (film), a 1969 film
