= Conscience (disambiguation) =

Conscience is a mental faculty that distinguishes right from wrong.

Conscience may also refer to:

== Literature ==
- Of Conscience, essay by Michel de Montaigne; see Essais, Book II, Chapter 5
- Conscience (magazine), online magazine published by Catholics for Choice
- Conscience (play), 1821 tragedy by the Irish writer James Haynes

== Music ==
- Conscience (The Beloved album), 1993
- Conscience (Womack & Womack album), 1988
- The Conscience, 1999 free jazz album by Paul Rutherford and Sabu Toyozumi
- "Conscience" (song), 2024 rap song by Gunna
- "Conscience", a 1962 single by James Darren
- Conscience Records, a 1990s American record label
- Conscience, Canadian rapper in the collective Sweatshop Union

== Film and television ==
- Conscience (1917 film), by Bertram Bracken
- La ruota del vizio, 1920 film by Augusto Genina
- Conscience (2008 film), 2008 Turkish film
- "Conscience" (Law & Order: Criminal Intent), an episode of Law & Order: Criminal Intent

== Other ==
- Conscience, the ship attacked in the May 2025 Gaza Freedom Flotilla incident
- 12524 Conscience, a minor planet
- Conscience: Taxes for Peace not War, London based peacebuilding organisation
- Social conscience

== Name ==
- Hendrik Conscience (1812–1883), Belgian writer

== See also ==
- Consciousness
