= Master Clarke =

1840 play

- Original language: English
- Written by: Thomas James Serle
- Genre: Historical
- Setting: London, 17th century

Premiere
- Date: 26 September 1840
- Place: Theatre Royal, Haymarket, London

Master Clarke is an 1840 historical play by the British writer Thomas James Serle. It premiered at the Theatre Royal, Haymarket on 26 September 1840. It revolves around the life of Richard Cromwell, deposed Lord Protector of England, during the seventeenth century.

== Cast ==
The original cast included William Macready as Richard Cromwell, Benjamin Nottingham Webster as Charles II of England, Samuel Phelps as General Lord Disbrowe, Walter Lacy as Ingoldsby, Henry Howe as Sir Richard Willis, William Henry Oxberry as Smoothly, George John Bennett as Captain Darnel and Helena Faucit as Lady Dorothy Cromwell. The play was not a great success, partly due to the fact that Macready had not properly learned the part which was to be a growing problem for him.

== Bibliography ==
- Carlisle, Carol Jones. Helen Faucit: Fire and Ice on the Victorian Stage. Society for Theatre Research, 2000.
- Downer, Alan Seymour. The Eminent Tragedian William Charles Macready. Harvard University Press, 1966.
- Nicoll, Allardyce. A History of Early Nineteenth Century Drama 1800-1850. Cambridge University Press, 1930.
