= Jacqueline of Holland (novel) =

1831 novel

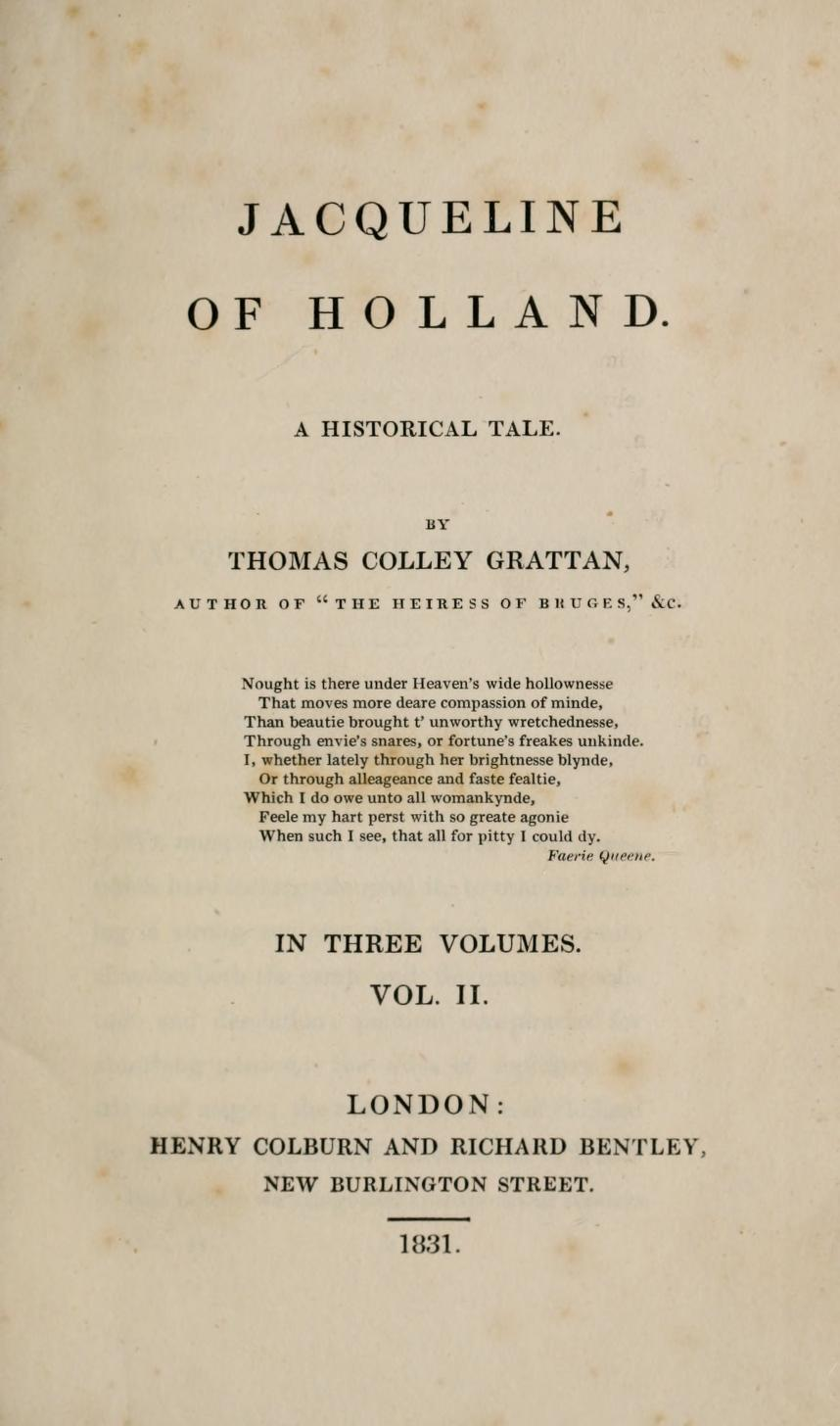
- Author: Thomas Colley Grattan
- Language: English
- Publisher: Colburn and Bentley
- Publication date: 1831
- Publication place: United Kingdom
- Media type: Print

Jacqueline of Holland is an 1831 historical novel by the Irish writer Thomas Colley Grattan, published in three volumes. It depicts the life of Jacqueline, Countess of Hainaut, the early fifteenth century ruler of much of the Low Countries. Amongst the other characters who feature is Humphrey, Duke of Gloucester, the brother of Henry V of England. Grattan had enjoyed success with another historical novel set in the region The Heiress of Bruges the previous year, and both books drew inspiration from the works of Walter Scott. Grattan dedicated the book to his friend, the Irish military doctor Arthur Brooke Faulkner.

== Bibliography ==
- Fenoulhet, Jane, Quist, Gerdi & Tiedau, Ulrich (ed.). Discord and Consensus in the Low Countries, 1700-2000. UCL Press, 2016.
- Loeber, Rolf, Stouthamer-Loeber, Magda & Burnham, Anne Mullin. A Guide to Irish Fiction, 1650-1900. Four Courts, 2006.
- Van Doorslaer, Luc, Flynn, Peter & Leerssen, Joep (ed.). Interconnecting Translation Studies and Imagology. John Benjamins Publishing Company, 2016.
