= Thomas James Serle =

English actor and journalist

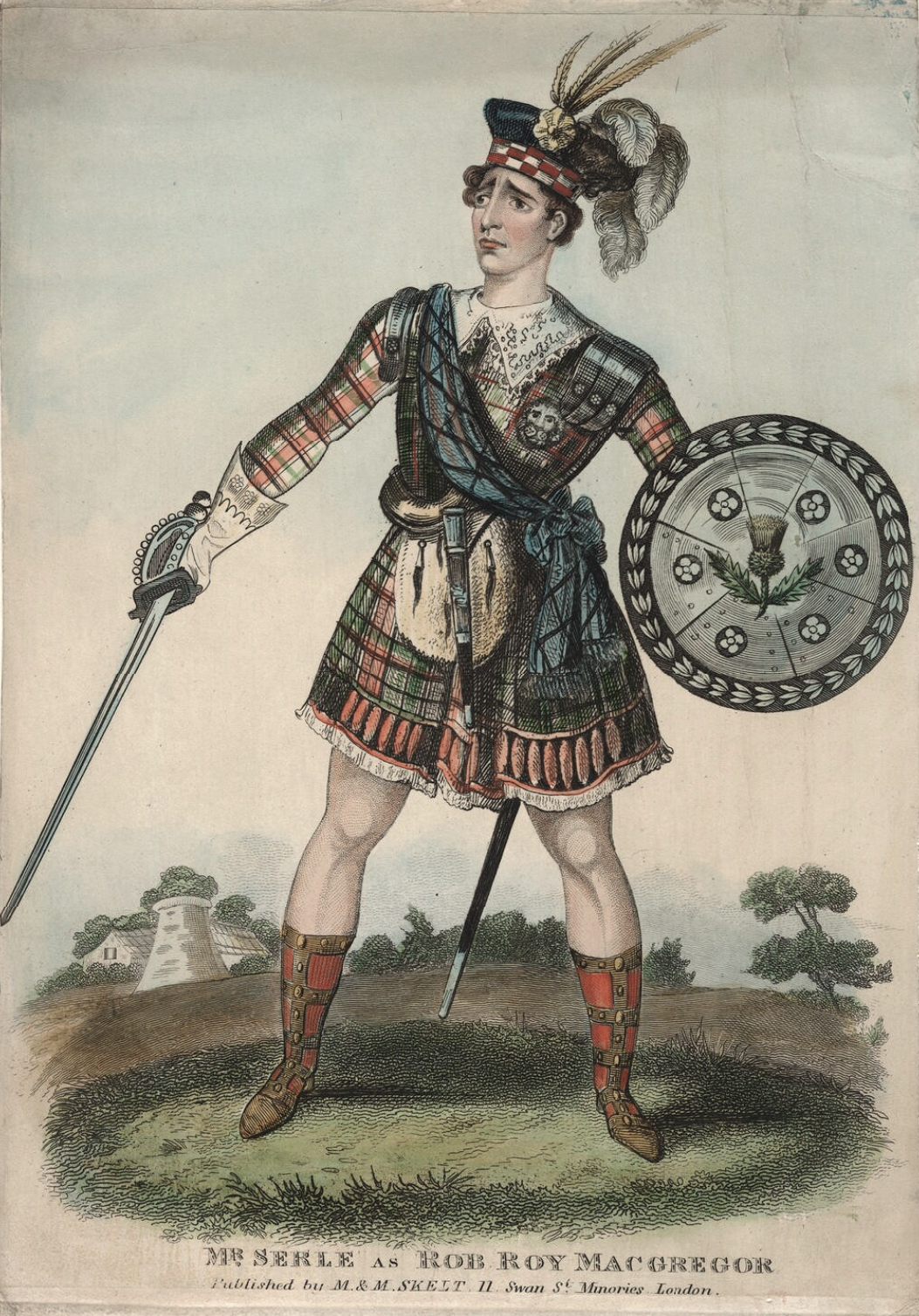
Thomas James Serle, in character as Rob Roy Macgregor

Thomas James Serle (1798–1889) was an English dramatist and actor. He was also a journalist with the Weekly Dispatch.

== Early life ==
Serle was born in Gracechurch Street, London, on 28 October 1798, and educated for the Bar. Between the ages of 16 and 18, he wrote four five-act plays, which were presented to Drury Lane Theatre by Peter Moore, then on its committee, without result.

At the age of 18 Serle played Romeo at the Theatre Royal, Liverpool, with John Vandenhoff as Mercutio, in Romeo and Juliet; and soon after (1820 and 1821) played the lead in Hamlet at Cambridge, Croydon, and seven times at the Regency Theatre, Tottenham Court Road. He brought out a five-act play there, and acted the principal character, Rupert Duval, over three nights. Serle next played a season at the old Royalty Theatre, opening in Hamlet, at the time when Clarkson Frederick Stanfield painted the scenery there.

== On tour ==
Playing in the provinces, Serle brought out Waltheoff the Saxon in Exeter, and The Parricide at Dover. He managed the Dover theatre for two seasons, and played at Boulogne in the summer of 1824. In the spring of 1825, he played at the Royal Park Theatre in Brussels, while François-Joseph Talma was playing at La Monnaie. Talma introduced himself behind the scenes, and mentioned Serle at the British Embassy favourably. Thérésa Tallien, Princesse de Chimay, bespoke his Hamlet the second time.

== Return to London ==
Serle returned to England, playing at Lincoln and other venues. He was engaged at Covent Garden Theatre, and opened in Hamlet, during November 1825. He remained there three seasons, playing with Edmund Kean, Charles Mayne Young and Charles Kemble. He played at Norwich, and then at the Royal Coburg Theatre, with Kean. He translated and adapted Dominique, Victim of St. Vincent, and The Man in the Iron Mask, playing the principal characters.

When an attempt was made around 1830 by the London patent theatres to close their rival minor theatres, Serle took part in the resistance movement. There was a majority in the House of Commons for abolishing the monopoly, but the Lords threw out the Bill. Afterwards, however, a jury refused to convict in the case of D. W. Osbaldiston, the manager of the Surrey Theatre.

== 1830s ==
Serle then wrote The Merchant of London, a play in five acts, produced at Drury Lane Theatre in the spring of 1832; The House of Colberg, in five acts, autumn of same year, William Macready acting in both. Serle about this time called together the "Dramatic Authors", by advertisement signed by himself and Douglas Jerrold, and so helped to found the Dramatic Authors Society, of which he was Honorary Secretary for some years. It acted as a pressure group for legitimate drama.

Serle's next production was The Yeoman's Daughter, a domestic drama, in two acts, in which, with the Lyceum Company, at the Adelphi Theatre, he played the principal character. In 1833 was produced The Ghost Story, two acts, under Bond's management at the Adelphi.

Serle became in 1834 stage-manager at the English Opera, Lyceum Theatre, and opened it with an address written and spoken by himself, The Yeoman's Daughter being the first piece. In this year he wrote and spoke the Prologue to Mary Russell Mitford's tragedy of Charles the First, produced at the Victoria Theatre (the renamed Royal Coburg Theatre), under William Abbot and Daniel Egerton.

In 1835 Serle produced and acted in The Shadow on the Wall, at the Lyceum (then also called the English Opera House), two acts; and Widow Queen, comedy, two acts. In Richard John Raymond's The Old Oak Tree, based on the memoirs of Jean Henri Latude, he played Latude there.

In 1836, Serle spoke the Prologue to the tragedy of Ion, on its first representation at Covent Garden, for Macready's benefit, and wrote The Witch's Son, two acts. He lectured on the plays of Shakespeare and dramatic subjects at institutions in London, Liverpool, and Manchester.

Serle joined the Covent Garden company under Macready in the autumn of 1837. He produced Afrancesado, Parole of Honour and Joan of Arc, each in two acts. The title role in Joan of Arc was played by Mary Huddart (later Warner); Henry Crabb Robinson thought well of the plot. Serle was acting manager, for the season 1838–9, and produced Agnes Bernauer, two acts. In 1840, he brought out Master Clarke, a play in five acts, on the subject of Richard Cromwell, at the Haymarket Theatre — Cromwell being acted by Macready. In autumn of 1840, he wrote four plays on the history of France, to be read as lectures, and read them at London institutions: The Proscribed, The Jacquerie, The Queen and the Minister and Gaston de Foix, each in five acts.

== 1840s ==
In autumn of 1841, Serle resumed acting management with Macready, at Drury Lane. He translated and adapted Sappho from Saffo, the opera by Giovanni Pacini. He remained acting-manager to the close of the season 1842–3, when Macready's tenure expired.

Serle's theatrical friends included Thomas James Thackeray, Edward Bulwer-Lytton and Douglas Jerrold. From then on, Serle began to concentrate on his other interests. He managed for John Mitchell (1806–1874) the English Company in Paris, 1844–5, when Macready and Helen Faucit played there; and wrote the opening address for Sadler's Wells (the Mary Warner–Samuel Phelps management). He produced there The Priest's Daughter, a tragedy.

Serle adapted Beaumont and Fletcher's Scornful Lady, and Double Marriage, for Mary Warner's management at the Marylebone Theatre. He put on a three-act domestic drama, at the Surrey Theatre, A Village Story, and a one-act comedy, Tender Precautions, at the Princess's Theatre, which was played at Windsor Castle the last time any theatrical performance was given there.

== End of theatrical career ==
In 1852 Serle's Annie Tyrrell, or Attree Copse, with theme the execution of a poacher, was put on at the Surrey Theatre. In the end he gave up the theatrical world.

== Death ==
Serle died, aged 90, at Novello Cottage, Worthing, on 18 March 1889.

== Works ==
Two early five-act plays, published but not known to have been performed, were Raffaele Cimaro (1819), and Fulvius Valeus (1823). He wrote the paper on Ben Jonson in No. 2 of the Retrospective Review. The 1832 essay "The State of the Drama", often attributed to Bulwer-Lytton, is now considered to be by Serle.

In 1838 and 1839 Serle travelled over the parts of France connected with Joan of Arc. He wrote The Players: or the Stage of Life (1847), a novel and Joan of Arc, a romance, published by Henry Colburn.

== Journalist ==
The Weekly Dispatch was a high-circulation popular newspaper in Victorian Britain. Serle wrote in it, under the pen name "Caustic". He served as its editor in the 1870s.

== Family ==
In 1836 Serle married Cecilia (1812–1890), daughter of Vincent Novello, and sister of Mary Cowden Clarke and Clara Novello. She had been a pupil of the singing teacher Mrs. Blaine Hunt, and performed in public. Their daughter Emma Clara (died 1877) was a soprano.

== Notes ==
Attribution
