= Ben Nazir, the Saracen =

1827 play

- Original language: English
- Written by: Thomas Colley Grattan
- Genre: Tragedy
- Setting: Pyrenees, 7th century

Premiere
- Date: 21 May 1827
- Place: Theatre Royal, Drury Lane, London

Ben Nazir, the Saracen is an 1827 historical tragedy by the Irish writer Thomas Colley Grattan. It premiered at the Theatre Royal, Drury Lane in London on 21 May 1827. The original cast included Edmund Kean as Ben Nazir, Henry John Wallack as Charles Martel, John Cooper as Eudes, Duke of Aquitaine, Alexander Pope as Clotaire, Thomas Archer as Mervan, Henry Southwell as Velid, Thomas Comer as Army officer, Benjamin Webster as a Slave, Harriet Smithson as Bathilda and Sarah West as Emerance. Kean was eager for a new play for his relaunch himself on the London stage after being forced to make a tour of America in the wake of the scandal of his affair with Constance Cox. He turned down Alfred the Great by James Sheridan Knowles and selected Ben Nazir, although its reception was disastrous.

== Bibliography ==
- Kahar, Jeffrey. The Cult of Kean. Routledge, 2017.
- Nicoll, Allardyce. A History of Early Nineteenth Century Drama 1800-1850. Cambridge University Press, 1930.
- Ziter, Edward. The Orient on the Victorian Stage. Cambridge University Press, 2003.
