= Arthur Faulkner (disambiguation) =

Arthur Faulkner (1921–1985) was a New Zealand politician.

Arthur Faulkner may also refer to:

- Arthur Brooke Faulkner (1779–1845), physician and writer
- Brian Faulkner (Arthur Brian Deane Faulkner, 1921–1977), last Prime Minister of Northern Ireland
