= The Heiress of Bruges =

1830 novel

- Author: Thomas Colley Grattan
- Language: English
- Publisher: Colburn and Bentley
- Publication date: 1830
- Publication place: United Kingdom
- Media type: Print

The Heiress of Bruges is an 1830 historical novel by the Irish writer Thomas Colley Grattan. It was released in four volumes by London publishers Henry Colburn and Richard Bentley. Grattan wrote the novel while living in Brussels, shortly before the Belgian Revolution led to its independence from Dutch rule. He dedicated to Lady Bagot, the wife of British Ambassador Sir Charles Bagot. The work is set in Bruges around 1600. He was inspired partly by the success of the Waverley novels, and one reviewer described novel as the work of a "Flemish Walter Scott". It was given a largely positive critical reception, sold fairly and well and was subsequently translated into several languages. Grattan followed it with another historical novel set in the Low Countries Jacqueline of Holland (1831).

== Bibliography ==
- Bridgwater, Patrick. De Quincey's Gothic Masquerade. Rodopi, 2004.
- Fenoulhet, Jane, Quist, Gerdi & Tiedau, Ulrich (ed.). Discord and Consensus in the Low Countries, 1700-2000. UCL Press, 2016.
- Van Doorslaer, Luc, Flynn, Peter & Leerssen, Joep (ed.). Interconnecting Translation Studies and Imagology. John Benjamins Publishing Company, 2016.
