= Belford Regis =

1835 novel

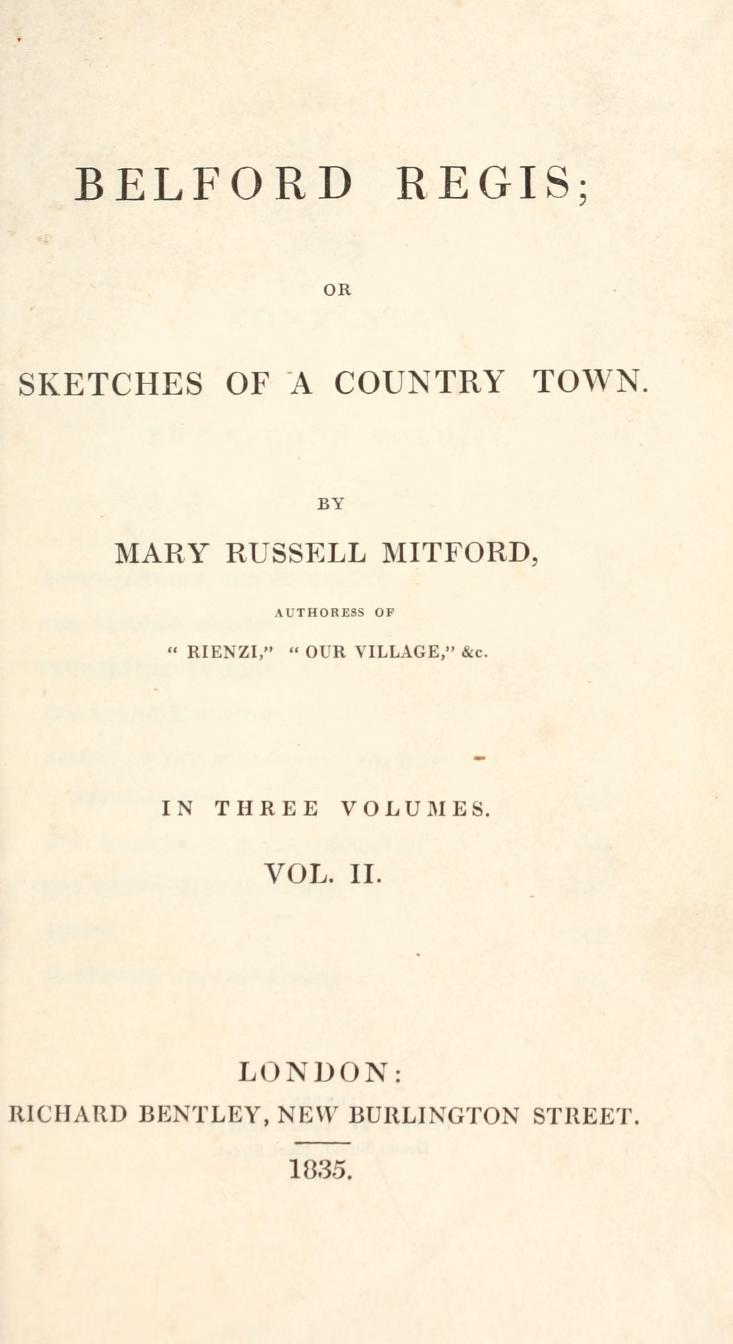
- Author: Mary Russell Mitford
- Language: English
- Publisher: Bentley
- Publication date: 1835
- Publication place: United Kingdom
- Media type: Print

Belford Regis is an 1835 novel by the British writer Mary Russell Mitford, published in three volumes. Mitford, known for her portrayals of country life in the Our Village works, switched her focus from a village to a more substantial town. She based it on Reading in Berkshire close to the village of Three Mile Cross where she lived with her father.

== Bibliography ==
- Parrinder, Patrick. Nation and Novel: The English Novel from its Origins to the Present Day. OUP Oxford, 2008.
- Sampson, George. The Concise Cambridge History of English Literature. CUP Archive, 1943.
