= Dobla =

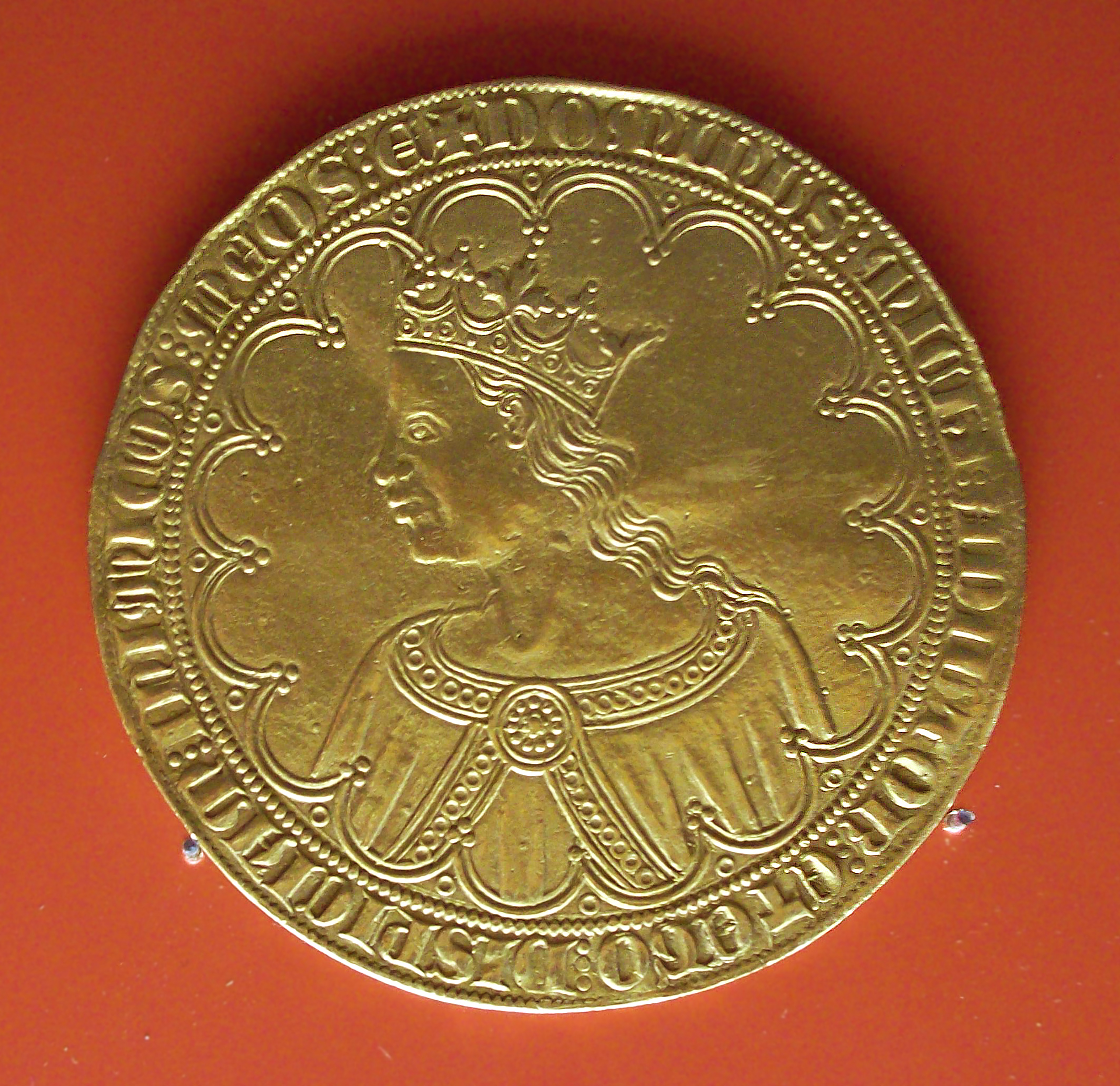
Gran dobla or dobla de a diez of Pedro I of Castile, minted in Seville in 1360 (Madrid).

The dobla (plural: doblas), including dobla castellana (excelente), gran dobla, dobla de la Banda, dobla cruzada, dobla alfonsi and dobla almohade, was the name of various Iberian gold coins between the 11th and 16th centuries, ranging in value from 2-870 maravedis, depending on the year. The name originated as the "double maravedi" (hence "dobla"), a term used by Castilians for the Muslim dinar, when the maravedí was re-valued as equivalent to the Muslim half-dinar, or masmudina, by Ferdinand III. However, years later, the dobla became various new coins, and at times, a dobla was the same as the newer coins enrique or castellano (but the dobla castellana became double their value in 1475). In general, a dobla was a valuable gold coin, while the maravedi was de-valued into silver (c. 1258) or rarely copper forms. In the 16th century, the dobla was replaced by the ducado, then by the escudo (in 1537) as the standard gold coin of Spain.

== Etymology ==
The word dobla is derived from the Spanish for "double maravedi" (or a Muslim dinar), when the maravedi was devalued as equivalent to the Muslim half-dinar, or masmudina. The maravedi was named after the Moorish Almoravids (Arabic المرابطون al-Murābitũn, sing. مرابط Murābit). The sister of Henry I of Castile, Berenguela, and his nephew Ferdinand III, had made a new coin, also called "maravedi" which was equivalent to the Muslim half-dinar. Because its value was only three-fifths of that of the maravedí of Alphonso VIII of Castile, the Muslim dinar became known among the Castilians as the "double" maravedí, or dobla.

== History ==
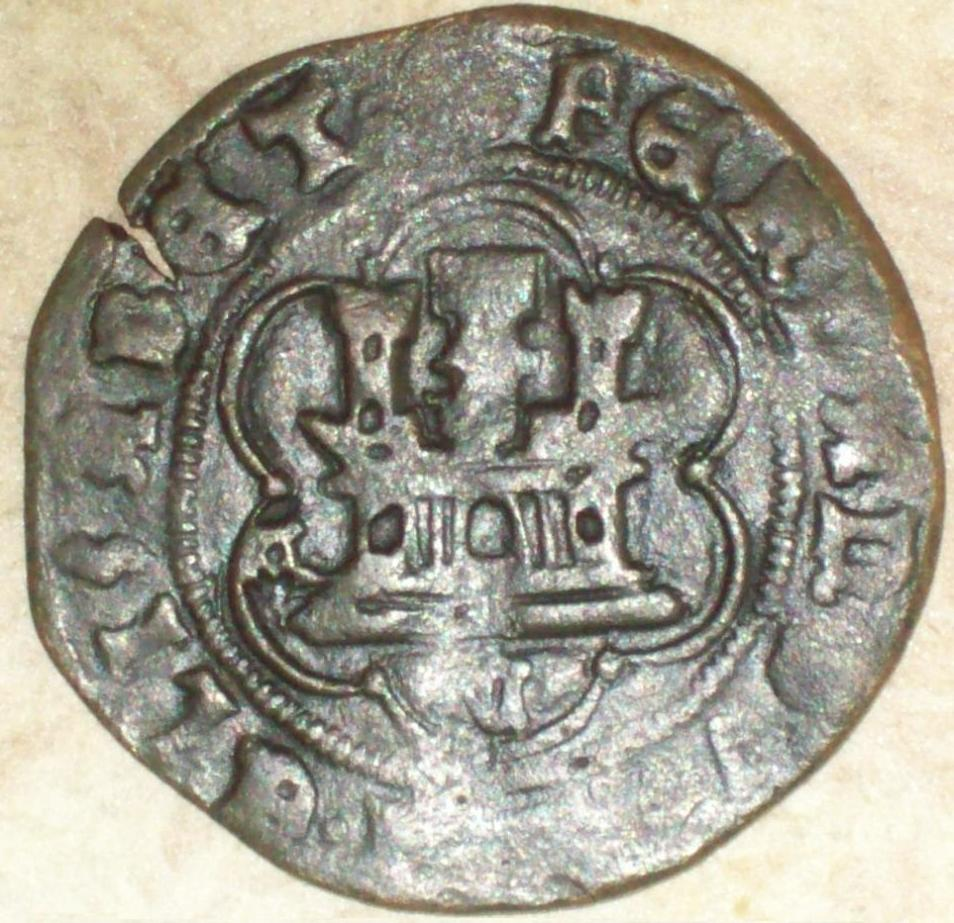

The term "dobla" was first used, as originally meaning the Muslim dinar, hundreds of years after the Spanish dinar was created. The gold dinar was first struck in Spain under Abd-ar-Rahman III, Emir of Córdoba (912-961). During the 11th century, the dinar became known as the morabit or morabotin throughout Europe, which developed into maravedís. In the 12th century, it was copied by the Christian rulers Ferdinand II of León (1157–1188) and Alphonso VIII of Castile (1158–1214). Alfonso's gold marabotin or maravedí retained inscriptions in Arabic but had the letters ALF at the bottom. Ferdinand II's gold maravedí weighed about 3.8 g.

Alfonso's son, Henry I of Castile, continued to mint gold maravedís during his short reign, but his sister Berenguela and nephew Ferdinand III made a coin which was equivalent to the Muslim half-dinar, or masmudina. This was also called a "maravedí", although its value was only three-fifths of the maravedí of Alfonso VIII. After this new, lower-value coin appeared, the Muslim dinar became known among the Castilians as the "double" maravedí, or dobla. The Christians' version of the dobla survived in Castile until it was replaced by a copy of the Venetian ducat, the ducado, in 1497. The Muslim rulers in North Africa and Granada meanwhile continued to mint masmudinas up to the reign of Ferdinand and Isabella.

In Castile, the maravedí de oro soon became the accounting unit for gold, alongside the sueldo (from solidus) for silver and the dinero (from denarius) for billon (vellón in Spanish).

The gold content of the maravedí fell to a gram during the reign of James I of Aragon (1213–1276), and it kept falling, eventually becoming a silver coin c.1258 under Alfonso X of Castile (1252–1284). By this time the word maravedí was being used for a specific coin officially, for any coin colloquially, and as a synonym for money itself, resulting in a certain confusion in interpreting 13th-century references to money, values, and coinage.

Alfonso X, for example, made three issues of vellón, in each of which the new coin was called a maravedí. His basic silver coin of 1258-1271 was also called a maravedí (maravedí de plata). It weighed 6.00 g and contained 3.67 g of fine silver. It was worth 30 dineros. At that time, the money of account was the Maravedí of 15 Sueldos or 180 Dineros, so that one maravedí as an accounting unit was worth six silver maravedí coins.

The silver maravedí money of account represented (according to one interpretation) about 22 g of silver in 1258. This had fallen to 11 g by 1271, to 3 g by 1286, and to 1.91 g in 1303. The gold maravedí had disappeared as a money of account by 1300. The maravedí de plata (silver maravedí) gradually came to be used as money of account for larger sums, for the value of gold coins, and for the mint price of silver, and eventually it supplanted the sueldo as the main accounting unit. Alfonso XI (1312–1350) did not call any of his coins a maravedí, and henceforth the term was used only as a unit of account and not as the name of a coin.

The ancient measure of Mecca, ordained by Muhammad and known in Castilian Spanish as the mitcal de la ley, continued to be the basis for measuring the metal content of Castilian coins during the late Middle Ages. The Castilian mark was thus smaller than that of the remainer of western Europe, so as to conform to the mitcal. The dobla continued in this form until the reign of the Catholic Monarchs, but there were many variations in the history of Castilian coins in the intervening years, including the reigns of John II and Henry IV. One complication was the minting by John II of some doblas which were made from the metal of coins from Muslim Málaga. These were named "doblas de la banda" and were used for many years, although they were not of such fine metal as the traditional form, which in that reign were known as doblas cruzadas, after the cross appearing in their design.

The 15th century was one of extreme monetary confusion in Castile, reaching a peak under Henry IV (1454–1474), who began a simplified standard for currencies. At the Cortes of Segovia in 1471, Henry IV tried to resolve the monetary anarchy then prevailing in his realm. He revalued the gold currency by restoring the old dobla to replace the dobla de la banda and named the new gold coin the enrique, castellano or dobla castellana. Henry IV then defined the "real" as the standard silver coin, with the blanca and media blanca (half) as low-value, silver-alloy currencies (vellón, or billon). Over one hundred legal mints, plus many illegal ones, were replaced by just six mints: in the towns of Burgos, La Coruña, Cuenca, Segovia, Seville and Toledo. However, Henry IV had lacked the means to enforce the monetary laws.

So, Ferdinand and Isabella found it necessary to confirm the 1471 monetary ordinances. In their declaration, issued at Segovia on 20 February 1475, they adopted Henry's coinage and set values for the doblas and reales in terms of the maravedí, which by the 15th century had degenerated into a vellón currency. Under the 1471 ordinances, only half-maravedís, or blancas, were minted. The 1475 declaration set the real at 30 maravedís. The standard gold coin, the dobla castellana, was named the excelente and valued at 870 mrs, while the enrique and castellano continued at half that value, 435 mrs. The dobla de la banda, which was still in use, although no longer minted, was valued at 335 maravedis.

The monetary system was finally reformed and stabilized under Ferdinand and Isabella, when they issued the Ordinance of Medina del Campo, June 2, 1497. The reform was completed by Charles I when he replaced the ducado (equivalent of the Venetian ducat) with the escudo as the standard gold coin in 1537. The maravedí then became the smallest Spanish unit of account, the thirty-fourth part of a silver real.

In the new world, nonetheless, there are documents which testify to the reduction of their value to less than the thirtieth part of a real. This reduction was on account of the cost and risk of their transportation from Spain, before the establishment of the first mint houses of Mexico and Santo Domingo. The maravedí remained a money of account in Spain until 1847.

After the discovery of America, copper maravedís were the first coins struck for the purpose of circulation in the colonial island of Hispaniola, and are thus considered the first coins for the New World. Crude maravedís were used as colonial change for smaller transactions. Initially produced in Spain specially for the Indies, they were later struck locally at Hispaniola years before the mints of Mexico and Santo Domingo were officially established.

== Notes ==
[s] - The main sources are:
