= Richard Major =

Richard Major or Richard Maijor (1605 – 25 April 1660) was a Member of Parliament during the English Commonwealth era.

Major was the son of John Maijor, merchant and MP for Southampton in 1628 and nephew of John Searle, MP for Newport, I.o.W in 1614. He matriculated at Queen's College, Oxford in November 1621. On his death the following year, John Searle bequeathed his nephew his mainland property. He graduated BA in 1624. In 1625 he married Ann (d. 1662), daughter of John Kingswell of the manor of Marvel in Carisbrooke, I.o.W.

He bought Hursley Park and Lodge, Hampshire in 1639 and served as High Sheriff of Hampshire for 1639–40. His eldest daughter, Dorothy, was married to Cromwell's eldest living son Richard Cromwell, who succeeded Oliver as Lord Protector in 1658.

Major sat for Hampshire in both the Barebones Parliament of 1653 and the First Protectorate Parliament of 1654 and was also appointed to Oliver Cromwell's Council of State.

He died in 1660 and was buried in Hursley Church. Hursley Park passed to Richard Cromwell and his heirs.

== Bibliography ==
- Hainsworth, Roger. The Swordsmen in Power: War and Politics under the English Republic, 1649-1660. Sutton Publishing, 1997.
