= Rienzi (play) =

1828 play

- Original language: English
- Written by: Mary Russell Mitford
- Genre: Tragedy
- Setting: Rome, 14th century

Premiere
- Date: 9 October 1828
- Place: Theatre Royal, Drury Lane, London

Rienzi is an 1828 historical tragedy by the British writer Mary Russell Mitford. It is based on the fourteenth century Italian political leader Cola di Rienzo. It premiered at the Theatre Royal, Drury Lane on 9 October 1828. The original cast included Charles Mayne Young as Cola di Rienzi, John Cooper as Angelo Colonna, George Yarnold as Paolo, and Harriet Faucit as Lady Colonna. It was Mitford's most successful play and for 34 nights from October to December 1828, and then appeared frequently in the United States.

== Bibliography ==
- Burwick, Frederick Goslee, Nancy Moore & Hoeveler Diane Long. The Encyclopedia of Romantic Literature. John Wiley & Sons, 2012.
- Matthews, David & Sanders, Michael. Subaltern Medievalisms: Medievalism 'from Below' in Nineteenth-century Britain. Boydell & Brewer, 2021.
- Nicoll, Allardyce. A History of Early Nineteenth Century Drama 1800-1850. Cambridge University Press, 1930.
