= Peter of Castile =

King of Castile and León (1350–1366, 1367–1369)

Peter
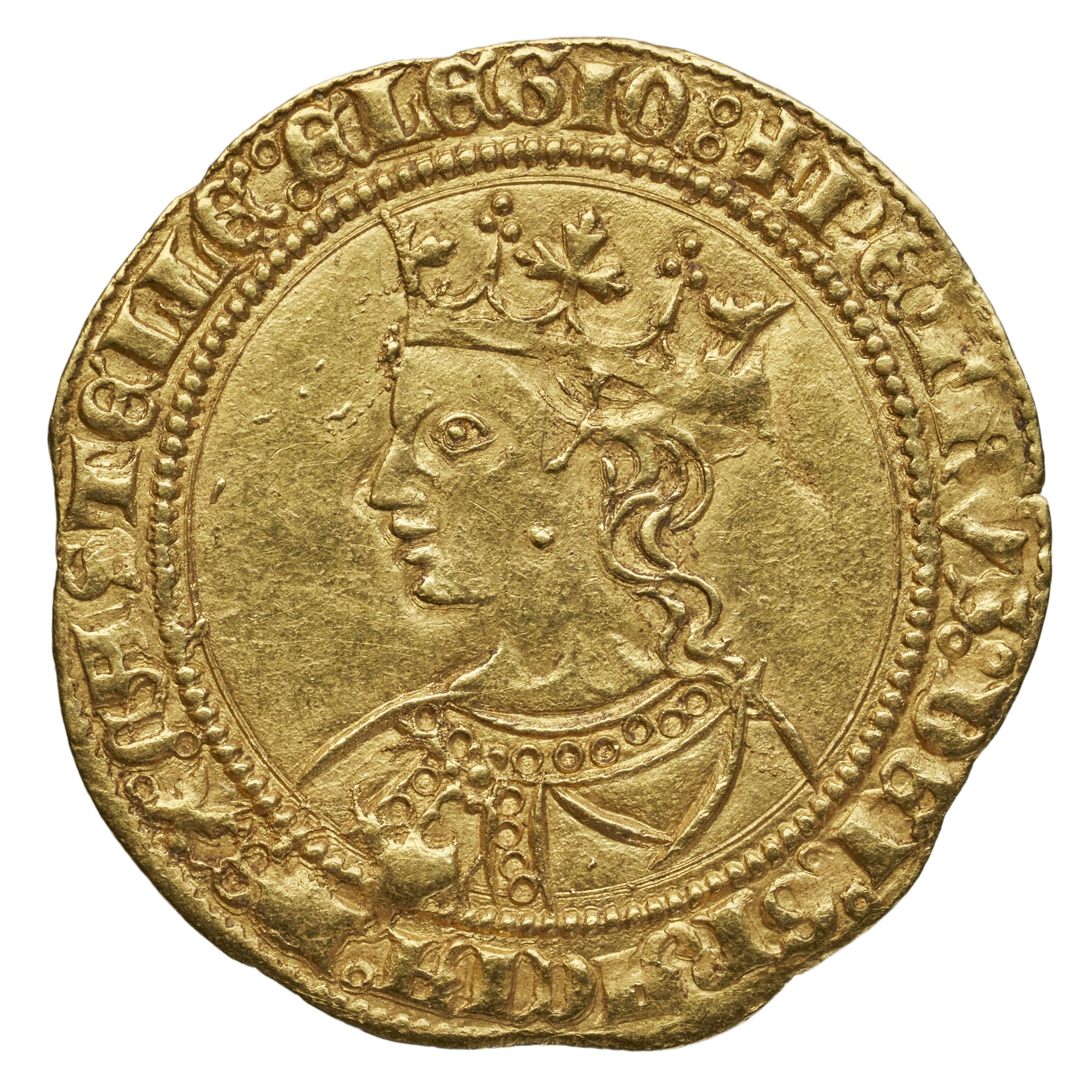
- Effigy of Peter on a gold dobla, c. 1350–68

King of Castile and León
- 1st reign: 26/27 March 1350 – 13 March 1366
- Predecessor: Alfonso XI
- Successor: Henry II
- 2nd reign: 3 April 1367 – 23 March 1369
- Predecessor: Henry II
- Successor: Henry II
- Born: 30 August 1334; Burgos, Castile
- Died: 23 March 1369 (aged 34); Montiel, Toledo
- Burial: Seville Cathedral
- Spouses: Blanche of Bourbon (m. 1353; died 1361) María de Padilla (died 1361) Juana de Castro (m. 1355; sep. 1355)
- Issue among others...: Beatrice, Infanta of Castille; Constance, Duchess of Lancaster; Isabella, Duchess of York; Alfonso, Infante of Castile
- House: Castilian House of Ivrea
- Father: Alfonso XI of Castile
- Mother: Maria of Portugal

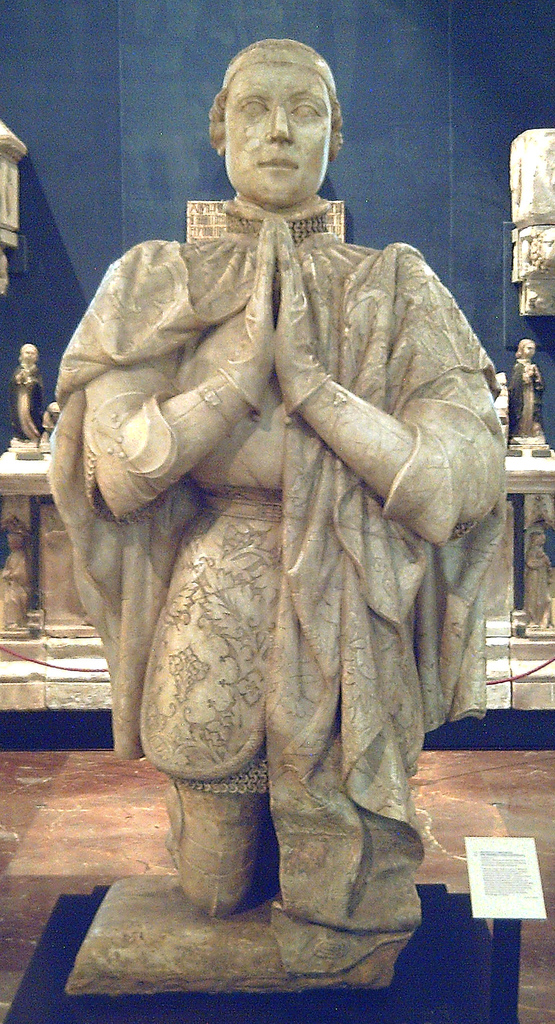
Alabaster sculpture of Peter, 1446

Peter (Spanish: Pedro; 30 August 1334 – 23 March 1369), called Peter the Cruel (el Cruel) or the Just (el Justo), (Note: Also known as Don Pedro in some English-language histories (Fotheringham 1889, p. 311; Storer 1911, The title).) was King of Castile and León from 1350 to 1369. Peter was the last ruler of the main branch of the House of Ivrea. He was excommunicated by Pope Urban V for his persecutions and cruelties committed against the clergy.

== Early life ==
Peter was born in the defensive tower of the Monasterio de Santa María la Real de Las Huelgas in Burgos, Spain. His parents were Alfonso XI of Castile and Maria of Portugal. According to chancellor and chronicler Pedro López de Ayala, he had a pale complexion, blue eyes and very light blond hair; he was 1.83 metres (6 ft 0 in) tall and muscular. He was accustomed to long, strenuous hours of work, lisped a little and "loved women greatly". He was well read and a patron of the arts, and in his formative years he enjoyed entertainment, music and poetry. He was to be married to his contemporary Joan, the second and favourite daughter of King Edward III of England; however, on their way to Castile she and her retinue travelled through cities infested with the Black Death, ignoring townspeople who had warned them not to enter their settlements. Since the plague had not yet entered England, it is likely that they underestimated the danger. Joan soon contracted the disease and died in 1348, aged 14.

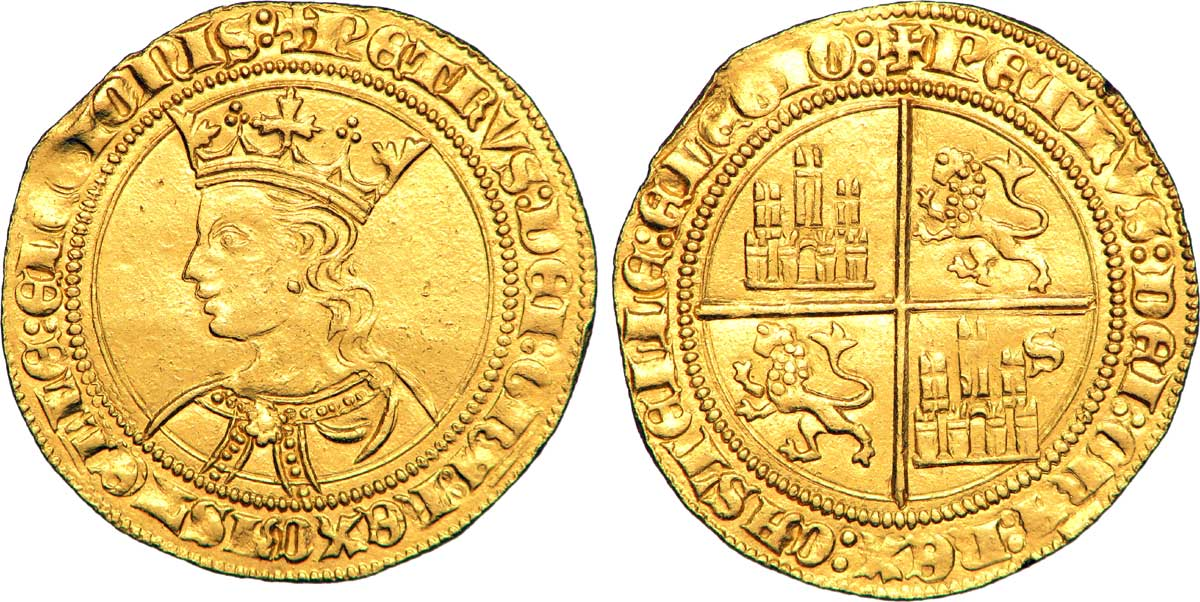
Dobla of 35 maravedís with the effigy of Peter of Castile

About two years later Peter began his reign when almost sixteen years old and subject to the control of his mother and her favourites. Though at first controlled by his mother, Maria of Portugal, Peter ascended the throne with the encouragement of his mother's second cousin, the Portuguese minister Count Alburquerque. In the summer of 1353, Peter married Blanche of Bourbon. Two days later, he abandoned her for María de Padilla. In 1355 he married Juana de Castro, widow of Don Diego de Haro, convincing her that his previous marriage to Queen Blanche was a nullity. The bishops of Avila and Salamanca were asked to concur, and were afraid to say otherwise. Peter and Juana were married in Cuellar, and Juana was proclaimed Queen of Castile. After two nights, he then deserted her. They had a son Juan, who died in 1405 at the age of fifty. The king was briefly captured at the Monastery of Santo Domingo of Toro, with his Jewish treasurer. They both were released after being ransomed. In 1361, Queen Blanche died at Medina Sidonia. French historians claim that Peter ordered two Jews to murder her; another version of the story says she was poisoned; a third one that she was shot with a crossbow, although it may have been the plague. Also that year, Maria de Padilla died in Seville. After Maria's death, Peter declared that she had been his first and only legitimate wife.

== Wars with Aragon ==
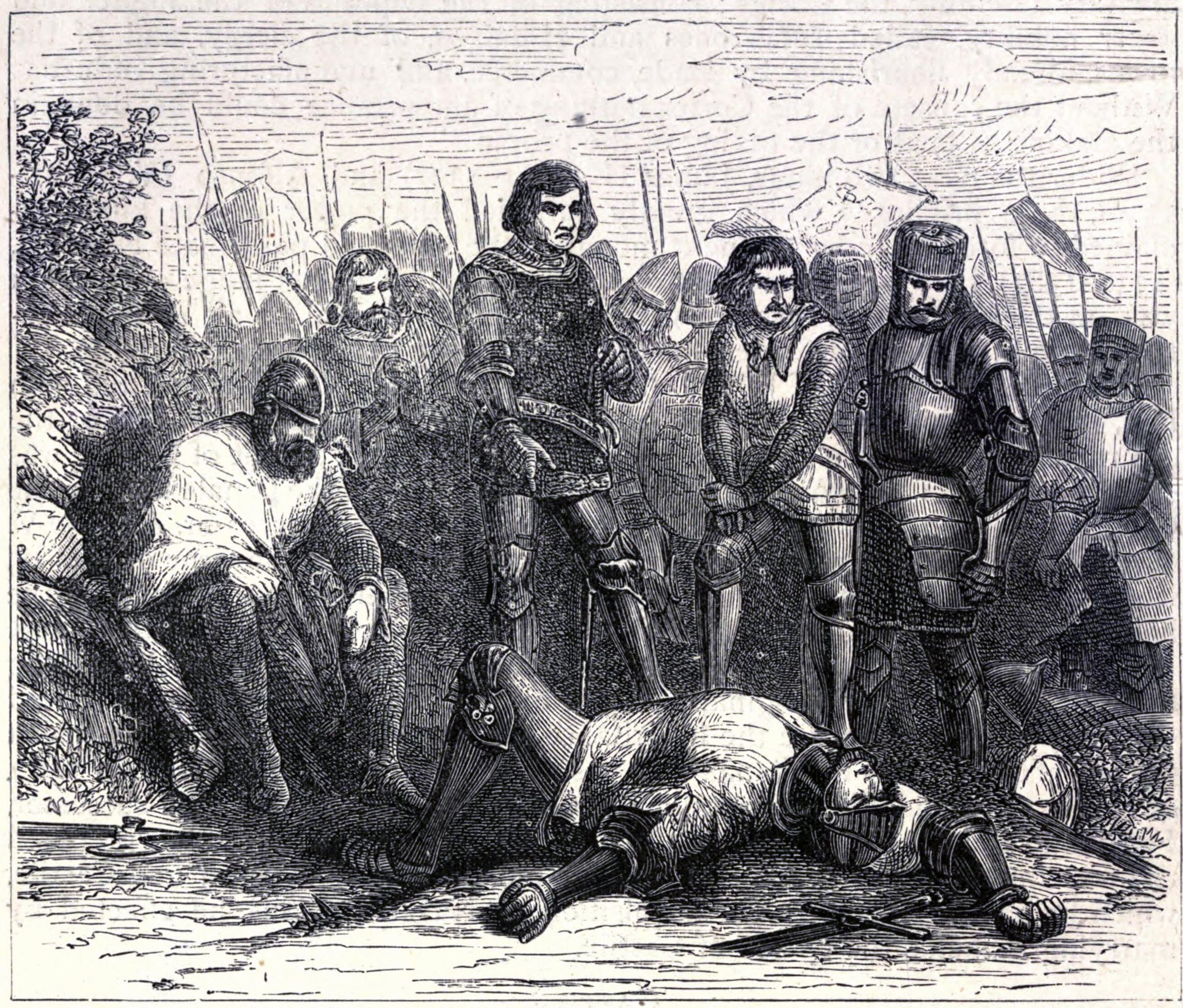
War of Peter The Cruel in Castile.The illustrated history of the world for the English people. Painting of 1884.

From 1356 to 1366, Peter engaged in constant wars with Aragon in the "War of the Two Peters". The Catholic Church’s French pope in Avignon, responded to the multiple pleas to have the border war cease. France and Aragon had been losing valuable lands and men to Castile. Pope Innocent VI played peacemaker, using his authority with a papal legate. He sent Cardinal Guillaume to discuss a truce, stopping the war for one year between the two Catholic kings named Pedro. The king of Aragon supported Peter's bastard brothers against him. It was during this period that Peter perpetrated the series of murders which made him notorious. In 1366 began the calamitous Castilian Civil War, at the end of the War of Two Peters (Pedros) which would see him dethroned. He was assailed by his bastard brother Henry of Trastámara at the head of a host of soldiers of fortune, including Bertrand du Guesclin and Hugh Calveley, and abandoned the kingdom without daring to give battle, after retreating several times (first from Burgos, then from Toledo, and lastly from Seville) in the face of the oncoming armies. Peter fled with his treasury to Portugal, where he was coldly received by his uncle, King Peter I of Portugal, and thence to Galicia, in the northern Iberian Peninsula, where he ordered the murder of Suero Gómez de Toledo, the archbishop of Santiago, and the dean, Peralvarez.

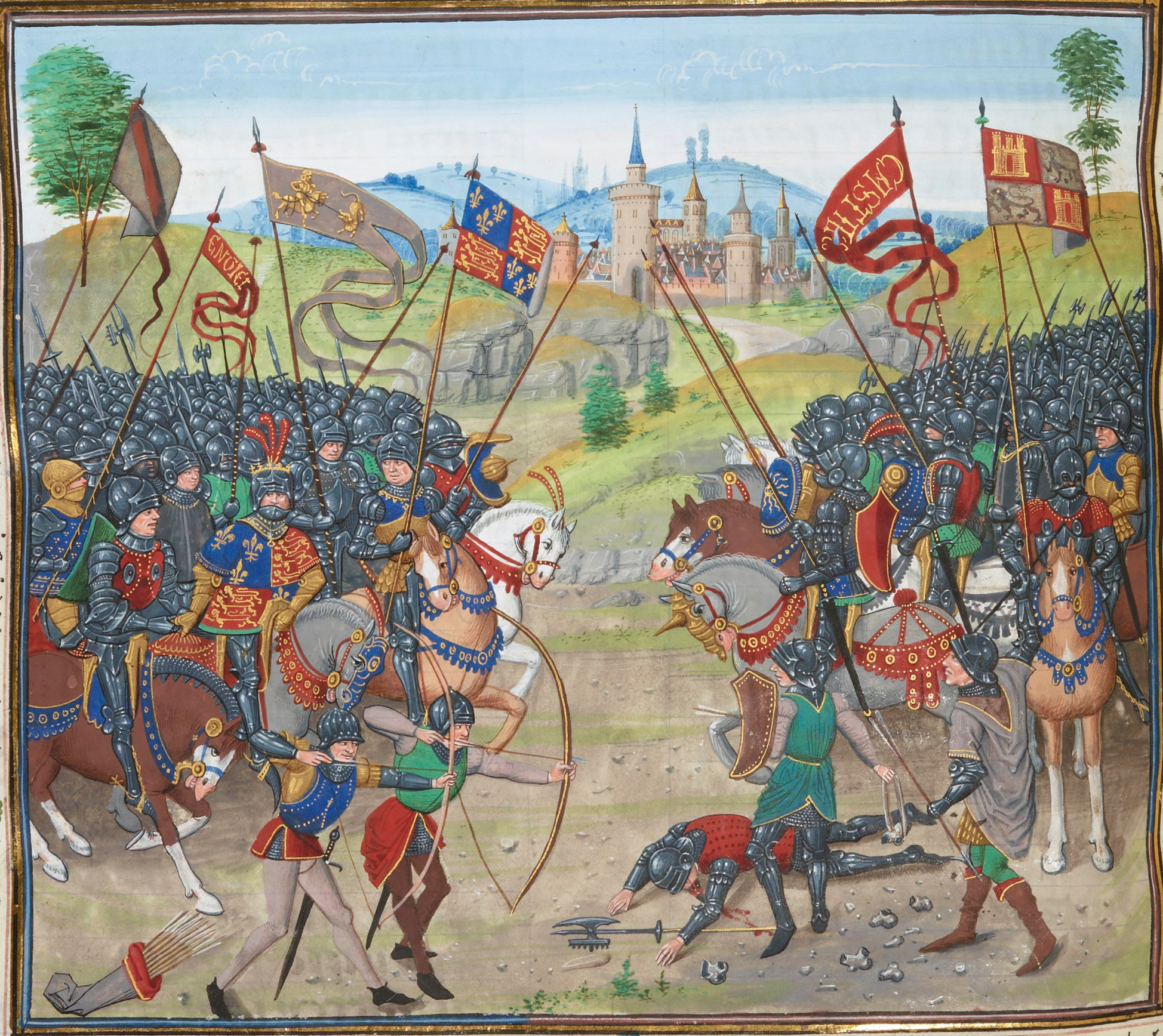
The Battle of Nájera in a 15th-century manuscript (Peter and the English are on the left).

== Peter and the Spanish Jewry ==
Peter's rival Henry II of Castile continuously depicted Peter as "King of the Jews", and had some success in taking advantage of popular Castilian antisemitism. Henry instigated pogroms beginning a period of anti-Jewish riots and forced conversions in Castile that lasted approximately from 1370 to 1390. Peter took forceful measures against this, including the execution of at least five anti-Jewish leaders of a riot. The prominence of Samuel ha-Levi, King Peter's treasurer, has often been cited as evidence of Peter's supposed pro-Jewish sentiment, but Ha-Levi's success did not necessarily reflect the general experience of the Spanish Jewry in this period which was often marked by discrimination and pogroms. Following Peter's death, Jews had to wear a yellow badge, as punishment for having supported him.

== Death ==
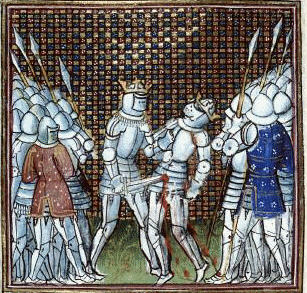
Henry II kills his predecessor Peter, in an early illustration to Froissart's Chronicles.

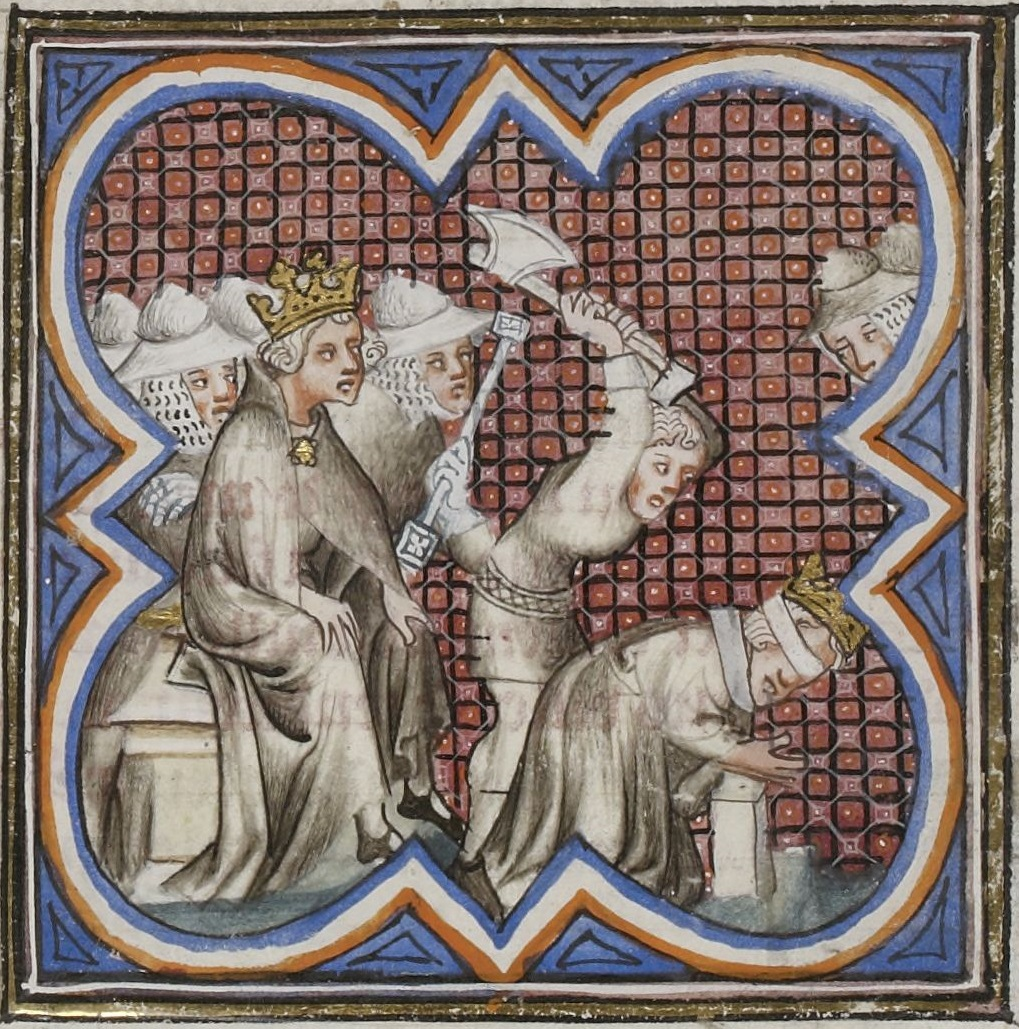
Peter the Cruel decapitated by order of Henry II of Castile. Manuscript from 15th century

In the summer of 1366, Peter took refuge with Edward, the Black Prince, who restored him to his throne in the following year after the Battle of Nájera. The health of the Black Prince broke down, and he left the Iberian Peninsula, bringing with him two of Peter's daughters, Constance and Isabella of Castile, whom he had taken as hostages as assurers that Peter would pay up. He married the princesses to his younger brothers, most famously Constance to his brother John of Gaunt, in order to make a claim on the Castilian throne. Meanwhile, Henry of Trastámara returned to Castile in September 1368. The cortes of the city of Burgos recognized him as King of Castile. Others followed, including Córdoba, Palencia, Valladolid, and Jaén. Galicia and Asturias, on the other hand, continued to support Peter. As Henry made his way toward Toledo, Peter, who had retreated to Andalusia, chose to confront him in battle. On 14 March 1369, the forces of Peter and Henry met at Montiel, a fortress then controlled by the Order of Santiago. Henry prevailed with the assistance of Bertrand du Guesclin. Peter took refuge in the fortress, which, being controlled by a military order of Galician origin, remained faithful to him. Negotiations were opened between Peter and his besieger, Henry. Peter met with du Guesclin, who was acting as Henry's envoy. Peter offered du Guesclin 200,000 gold coins and several towns, including Soria, Almazán, and Atienza to betray Henry. Ever opportunistic, du Guesclin informed Henry of the offer and immediately bargained for greater compensation from Henry to betray Peter. Having made a deal with Henry, Du Guesclin returned to Peter. Under the guise of accepting his deal, du Guesclin led Peter to his tent on the night of 23 March 1369. Henry was waiting. The historian López de Ayala described the encounter as follows: "Upon entering du Guesclin's tent, Henry saw King Peter. He did not recognize him because they had not seen each other for a long time. One of Bertrand's men said 'This is your enemy.' But King Henry asked if it was he and King Peter said twice, 'I am he, I am he.' Then King Henry recognized him and hit him in the face with a knife and they ... fell to the ground. King Henry struck him again and again." Having dispatched his half-brother, Henry left Peter's body unburied for three days, during which time it was subjected to ridicule and abuse.

== Legacy and reputation ==
From The Monk's Tale

O noble, O worthy PETRO, glorie OF SPAYNE, Whom Fortune heeld so hye in magestee,

Wel oughten men thy pitous death complayne!

Out of thy land thy brother made thee flee,

And after, at a seege, by subtiltee,

Thou were bitraysed and lad unto his tente,

Where as he with his owene hand slow thee,

Succedynge in thy regne and in thy rente.

— Chaucer, The Canterbury Tales

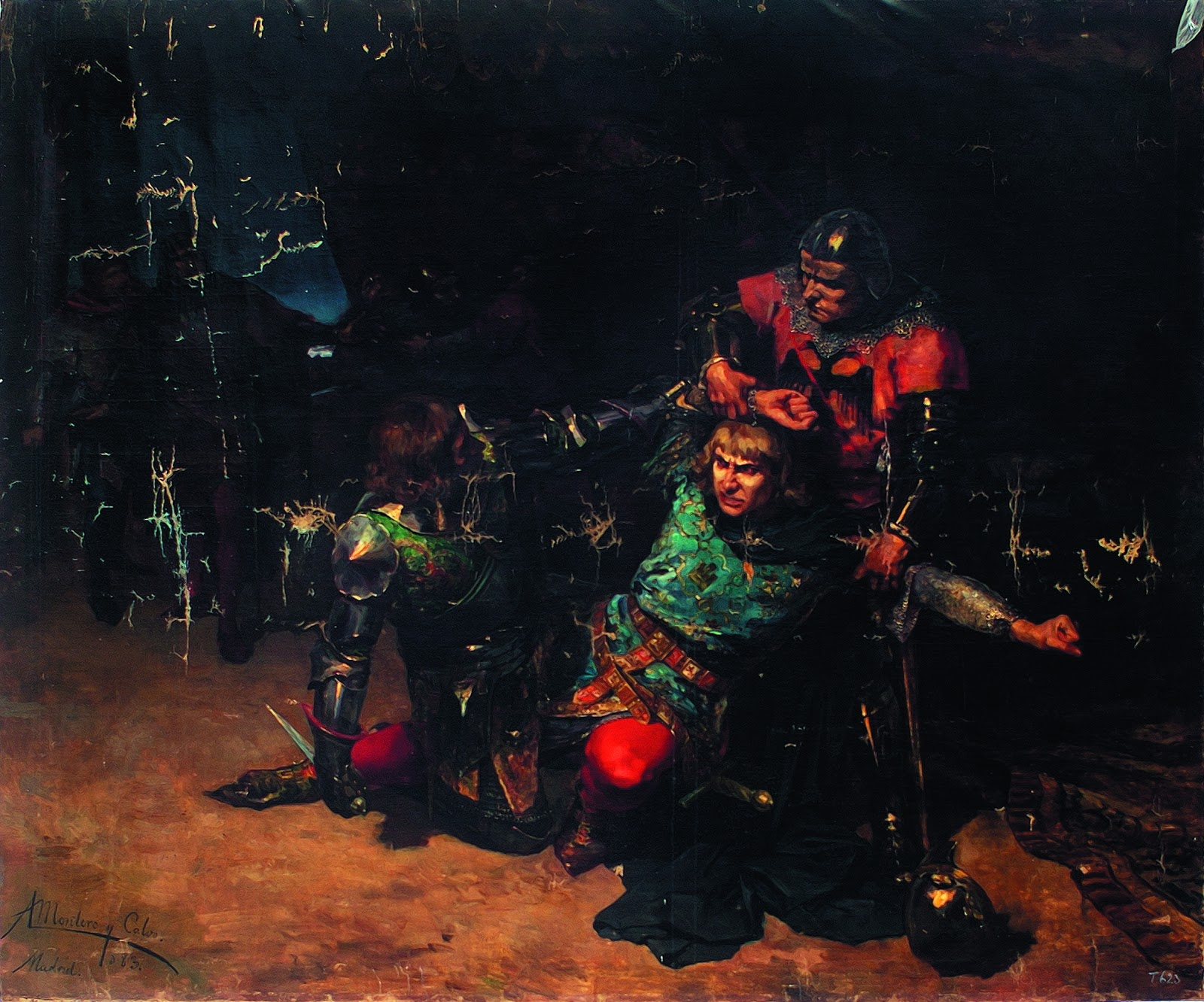
The death of King Peter of Castile, painting in 1883 by Arturo Montero y Calvo. Museo del Prado.

Popular memory generally views King Peter I as one of the few monarchs who sided with an Islamic sultan (Granada), while also being a Catholic king. Granada paid Pedro I tribute. He helped them during several invasions and a coup. One of the rewards he was given by a sultan of Granada was the famous ruby, a reward for killing an usurper, that is now in the crown of England, brought back by The Black Prince of England along with Peter I's surviving two daughters (Constance and Isabella of Castile, who were legitimized). Not all of Peter's reputation comes from the works of the chronicler Pero López de Ayala, who after his father's change of allegiance had little choice but to serve Peter's usurper. After time passed, there was a reaction in Peter's favour and an alternative name was found for him. It became a fashion to speak of him as El Justiciero, the executor of justice (the Lawful). Apologists were found to say that he had killed only men who would not submit themselves to the law or respect the rights of others. Peter did have his supporters. Even López de Ayala confessed that the king's fall was regretted by many, among them the peasants and burghers subjected to the nobles by late feudal gifts and by the merchants, who enjoyed security under his rule. The English, who backed Peter, also remembered the king positively. Geoffrey Chaucer visited Castile during Peter's reign and lamented the monarch's death in The Monk's Tale, part of The Canterbury Tales. (Chaucer's patron, John of Gaunt, had fought on Peter's side in his struggle to reclaim the throne.) The English Lake Poet Robert Southey was presented in 1818 with a copy of a five-act play by the novelist Ann Doherty, entitled Peter the Cruel, King of Castile and Leon. Peter had many qualities of those later monarchs educated in the centralization style. He built a strong Royal administrative force ahead of his times. He failed to counter or check all the feudal powers that supported his rivals, however illegitimate and opposite to the principles of aristocracy they represented themselves. But his moral superiority was reduced too by the violent means, including fratricides, by which he sought to suppress opposition; he at times was extremely despotic and unpredictable, even by the standards of his age. In this he was preceded by his father Alfonso XI, who since the crisis at the death of Alfonso X had faced multiple rebellions against royal authority. The death of King Peter ended the traditional alliance of Castile and Navarre with England, which had been started by the Plantagenets to keep France in check. The alliance was later renewed by the Trastámaras and Tudors. His death also led to the Fernandine Wars, where Portuguese king Ferdinand I would claim the throne of Galicia, which would eventually lead to the historical alliance between Portugal and England with the involvement of John of Gaunt's claim to Castille.

== Children ==
Peter's children by María de Padilla were:

- Beatrice (1353–1369), nun at the Abbey of Santa Clara at Tordesillas
- Constance (1354–1394), married John of Gaunt, 1st Duke of Lancaster
- Isabella (1355–1392), married Edmund of Langley, 1st Duke of York
- Alfonso (1359–1362), Peter recognized Alfonso as his legitimate heir on 29 April 1362. However, Alfonso, a very sickly child, died at the age of three, months after his recognition as Crown Prince.

Peter and Juana de Castro had:

- John (1355–1405), married doña Elvira de Eril, had issue. Juan married while in captivity warder Beltran de Eril's daughter, Elvira, and had two children: Pedro, Bishop of Osma and Palencia (d. 1461), and Constanza (d. 1478), named after King Pedro's I daughter, and she was Prioress of Santo Domingo El Real.

Peter and María de Henestrosa had:

- Fernando de Castilla (1361–1362)

Peter and Isabel de Sandoval had:

- Sancho de Castilla (1363–1371)
- Diego de Castilla (1365–1440)

Peter and Teresa de Ayala, niece of Pero López de Ayala, had:

- María de Castilla, had a long career at the Dominican convent of Santo Domingo el Real in Toledo and maintained a friendly correspondence with the Trastámaras.

== Sources ==
The great original but hostile authority for the life of Peter the Cruel is the Chronicle of the Chancellor Pedro López de Ayala (1332–1407). To put that in perspective are a biography by Prosper Mérimée, Histoire de Don Pedro I, roi de Castille (1848) and a modern history setting Peter in the social and economic context of his time by Clara Estow (Pedro the Cruel of Castile (1350–1369), 1995). Strictly speaking, Peter was not defeated by Henry but by the opposing aristocracy; the nobles accomplished their objective of enthroning a weaker dynasty (the House of Trastámara), much more amenable to their interests. Most of the bad stories about Peter are likely to be colored by black legend, coined by his enemies, who finally succeeded in their rebellion. The Chancellor López de Ayala, the main source for Peter's reign, was the official chronicler of the Trastámara, a servant of the new rulers and of Peter's aristocratic adversaries. The change of dynasty can be considered as the epilogue of the first act of a long struggle between the Castilian monarchy and the aristocracy; this struggle was to continue for more than three centuries and come to an end only under Charles I of Spain, the grandson of Ferdinand II of Aragon (Ferdinand V of Castile) and Isabella I of Castile (The Catholic Monarchs), in the first quarter of the 16th century.

== See also ==
Don Pèdre, roi de Castille, play by Voltaire, and the English variant Don Pedro, King of Castile by Lord Porchester.

== Notes ==
Peter of Castile Castilian House of Ivrea Cadet branch of the House of Ivrea Born: 30 August 1334 Died: 23 March 1369
Regnal titles
Preceded by Alfonso XI	King of Castile and León; 1350–1366	Succeeded by Henry II
Preceded by Henry II	King of Castile and León; 1367–1369	Succeeded by Henry II
