= Don Pedro, King of Castile =

1828 play

- Original language: English
- Written by: Lord Porchester
- Genre: Tragedy
- Setting: Castile, 14th century

Premiere
- Date: 10 March 1828
- Place: Theatre Royal, Drury Lane, London

Don Pedro, King of Castile is an 1828 historical tragedy by the British writer Lord Porchester. It premiered at the Theatre Royal, Drury Lane in London on 10 March 1828. The cast included William Macready as Henry, John Cooper as Don Pedro, James William Wallack as Raban, George Yarnold as Constable of France, Sarah West as Maria De Padilla and Ellen Tree as Blanche of Bourbon. It is based on the rule of the fourteenth century King of Castile Peter the Cruel.

== Synopsis ==
Blanche has been forced to marry King Peter, although she is really in love with his brother Henry. The king mistreats her and spends much of his time with his mistress Maria de Padilla. Maria schemes with her Jewish ally Raban to bring about the Queen's death, while Peter and Henry do battle with each other.

== See also ==
- Don Pèdre, roi de Castille

== Bibliography ==
- Genest, John. Some Account of the English Stage: From the Restoration in 1660 to 1830, Volume 9. H.E. Carrington, 1832.
- Nicoll, Allardyce. A History of Early Nineteenth Century Drama 1800-1850. Cambridge University Press, 1930.
- Swindells, Julia & Taylor, David Francis. The Oxford Handbook of the Georgian Theatre 1737-1832. OUP, 2014.
