= Don Pèdre, roi de Castille =

1775 tragedy in five acts by Voltaire

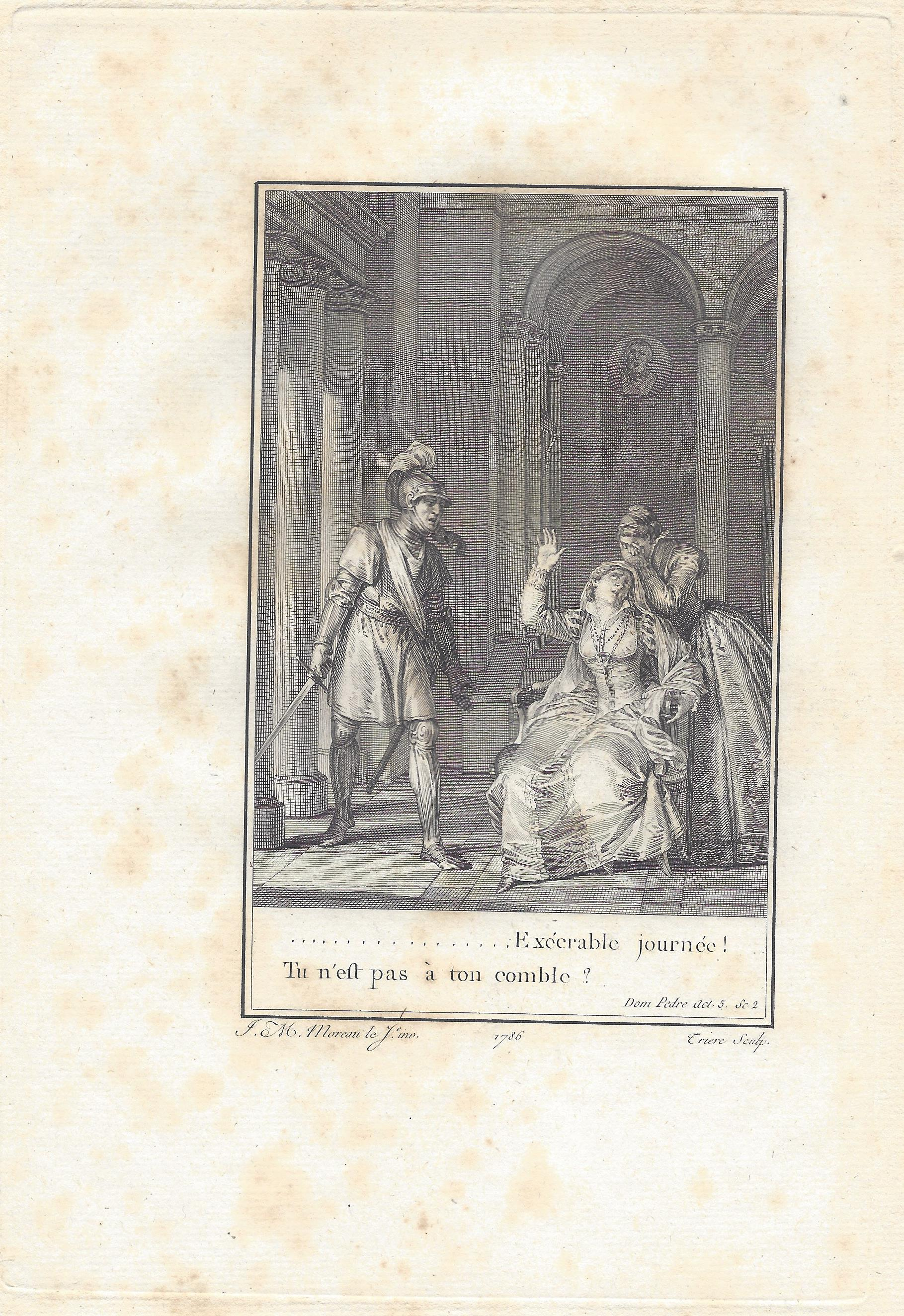
Jean-Michel Moreau: Illustration of Don Pedre 1786

Don Pèdre, roi de Castille (Don Pedro, King of Castille) is a tragedy in five acts by Voltaire. He began work on it in 1761 but only finished it in 1774. It was rejected by the Comédie-Française and published unperformed in 1775.

== Action ==
The action takes place at the court of medieval Castille. Don Pèdre (Peter of Castile) faces claims from his half brother Transtamare (Henry II of Castile) both for the throne and for the hand of Léonore de la Cerda. With better connections and the support of the Church, Transtamare defeats Don Pèdre with the help of French soldiers led by Bertrand du Guesclin. Transtamare murders Pèdre with his own hands and seizes the throne. Léonore chooses to die rather than endure marriage with him.

== Background ==
Voltaire began working on the material for the play in 1761. As his campaigns against Church abuses gathered pace (under the slogan 'écrasez l’infâme’) he reworked it to place particular emphasis on the unhealthy influence of the religious authorities. Voltaire's perspective on the characters was unusual; most previous writers had presented Transtamare as a hero and Don Pedro as his evil opponent; he reversed the usual roles.

== Publication ==
The Comédie-Française declined to put on the play, and it was not taken up by any other theatre. This rejection was not particularly to do with the play's critical attitude towards the Church, but more to do with the unsatisfactory and inconsistent characterisation. When the play was published, Voltaire added a dedicatory letter to d'Alembert and a historical and critical discourse about the tragedy, as well as four short texts: Éloge historique de la raison, De L'encyclopédie, Dialoque de Pégase et du vieillard and La Tactique.

== See also ==
- Don Pedro, King of Castile
