= The House of Colberg =

1832 play

- Original language: English
- Written by: Thomas James Serle
- Genre: Tragedy
- Setting: Colberg Castle, Germany

Premiere
- Date: 1 October 1832
- Place: Theatre Royal, Drury Lane, London

The House of Colberg is an 1832 tragedy by the British writer Thomas James Serle. It premiered at the Theatre Royal, Drury Lane on 1 October 1832. The original cast included William Macready as Colberg, John Cooper as Prince of Eisbach, Thomas Cooke as the Chaplain, and Robert William Honner as Steinfeldt. The play was dedicated to the writer Thomas Talfourd.

== Bibliography ==
- Downer, Alan Seymour. The Eminent Tragedian William Charles Macready. Harvard University Press, 1966.
- Nicoll, Allardyce. A History of Early Nineteenth Century Drama 1800-1850. Cambridge University Press, 1930.
