= Richard Cromwell =

English statesman (1626–1712)

His Highness Richard Cromwell
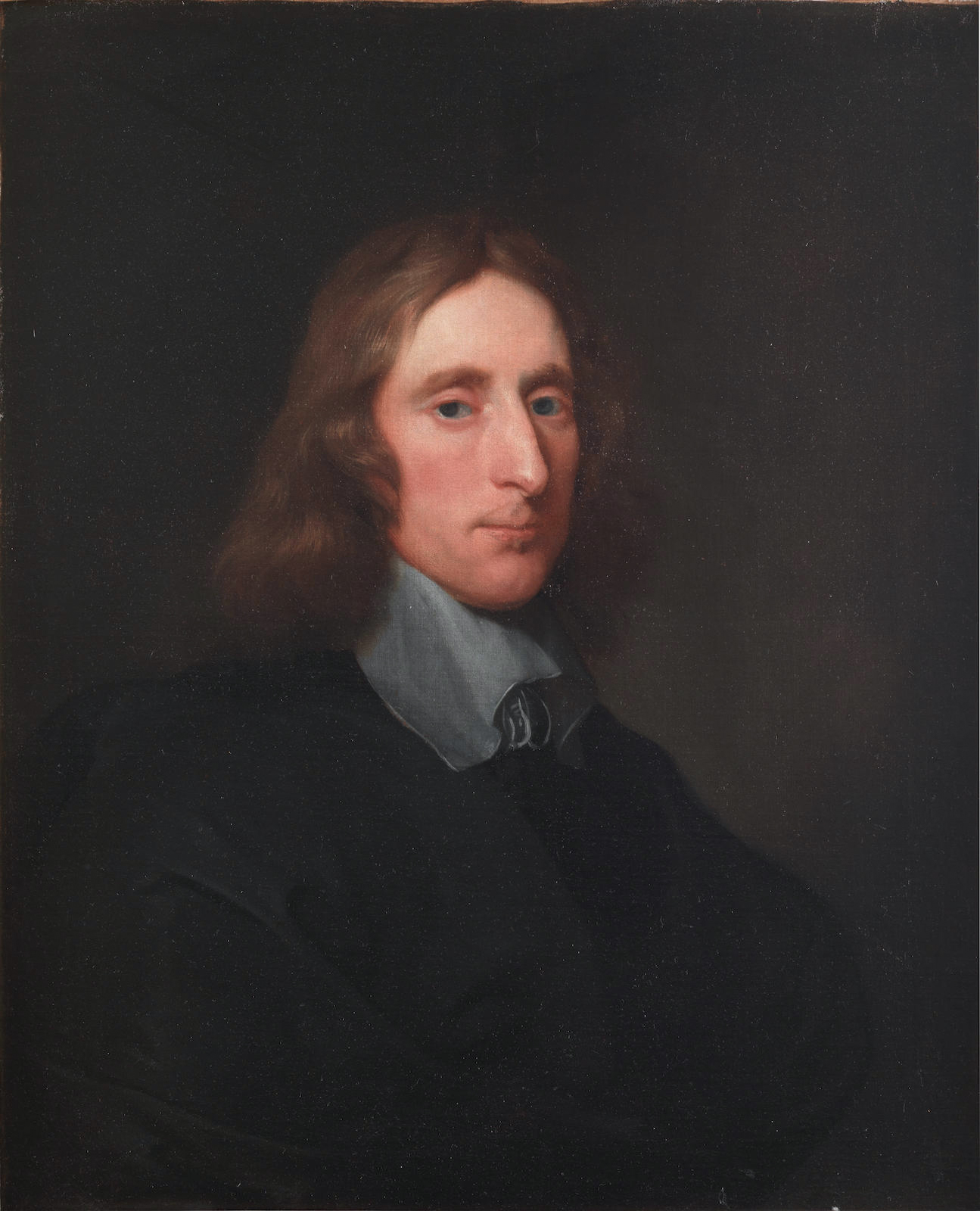
- Portrait by Gerard Soest

Lord Protector of the Commonwealth of England, Scotland and Ireland
- In office 3 September 1658 – 25 May 1659
- Preceded by: Oliver Cromwell
- Succeeded by: Council of State

Personal details
- Born: 4 October 1626 Huntingdon, Huntingdonshire, England
- Died: 12 July 1712 (aged 85) Cheshunt, Hertfordshire, Great Britain
- Spouse: Dorothy Maijor (m. 1649; died 1675)
- Relations: Robert Cromwell (grandfather)
- Children: See list: Edward Cromwell (1644–1688) Elizabeth Cromwell (1650–1731) Anne Cromwell (1651–1652) Mary Cromwell (1654) Oliver Cromwell (1656–1705) Dorothy Cromwell (1657–1658) Anna Cromwell Gibson (1659–1727) Dorothy Cromwell Mortimer (1660–1681)
- Parents: Oliver Cromwell (father); Elizabeth Bourchier (mother)
- Nickname: "Tumbledown Dick"

Military service
- Branch/service: New Model Army
- Years of service: 1647

Richard Cromwell (4 October 1626 – 12 July 1712) was an English statesman who served as Lord Protector of the Commonwealth of England, Scotland and Ireland from 1658 to 1659. He was the son of Lord Protector Oliver Cromwell.

Following his father's death in 1658, Richard became Lord Protector, but he lacked authority. He tried to mediate between the army and civil society, and allowed a Parliament that contained many disaffected Presbyterians and Royalists to sit. Suspicions that civilian councillors were intent on supplanting the army peaked in an attempt to prosecute a major-general for actions against a Royalist. The army made a threatening demonstration of force against Richard, and may have had him in detention. He formally renounced power only nine months after succeeding.

Though a Royalist revolt was crushed by the recalled civil war figure General John Lambert, who subsequently prevented the Rump Parliament from reconvening and created a Committee of Safety, Lambert found his troops melted away in the face of General George Monck's advance from Scotland. Monck then presided over the Restoration of 1660. Cromwell went into exile on the Continent, living in relative obscurity for the remainder of his life. He ultimately returned to his English estate and died thirty years later at the age of 85.

== Early years and family ==
Cromwell was born in Huntingdon on 4 October 1626, the third son of Oliver Cromwell and his wife Elizabeth. Little is known about his childhood. He and his three brothers were educated at Felsted School in Essex close to their mother's family home. There is no record of his attending university. In May 1647, he became a member of Lincoln's Inn; however, he was not called to the bar subsequently. Instead, in 1647 Richard joined the New Model Army as a captain in Viscount Lisle's lifeguard, and later that year was appointed captain in Thomas Fairfax's lifeguard.

In 1649, Cromwell married Dorothy Maijor, daughter of Richard Maijor, a member of the Hampshire gentry. He and his wife then moved to Maijor's estate at Hursley in Hampshire. During the 1650s they had nine children, five of whom survived to adulthood. Cromwell was named a Justice of the Peace for Hampshire and sat on various county committees. During this period, Richard seems to have been a source of concern for his father, who wrote to Richard Maijor saying, "I would have him mind and understand business, read a little history, study the mathematics and cosmography: these are good, with subordination to the things of God. Better than idleness, or mere outward worldly contents. These fit for public services, for which a man is born".

== Political background ==
Oliver Cromwell had risen from being an unknown member of Parliament in his forties to being a commander of the New Model Army, which emerged victorious from the English Civil War. When he returned from a final campaign in Ireland, Oliver became disillusioned at inconclusive debates in the Rump Parliament between Presbyterians and other schools of thought within Protestantism. Parliamentarian suspicion of anything smacking of Catholicism, which was strongly associated with the Royalist side in the war, led to the enforcement of religious precepts that left moderate Anglicans barely tolerated.

A Puritan regime strictly enforced the Sabbath, and banned almost all form of public celebration, including even at Christmas. Cromwell attempted to reform the government through an army-nominated assembly known as Barebone's Parliament, but the proposals were so unworkably radical that he was forced to end the experiment after a few months. Thereafter, a written constitution created the position of Lord Protector for Oliver and from 1653 until his death in 1658, he ruled with many of the powers of a monarch, while Richard took on the role of heir.

== Move into political life ==
In 1653, Richard Cromwell was passed over as a member of Barebone's Parliament, although his younger brother Henry was a member of it. Neither was he given any public role when his father was made Lord Protector in the same year; however, he was elected to the First Protectorate Parliament as M.P. for Huntingdon and the Second Protectorate Parliament as M.P. for Cambridge University.

Under the Protectorate's constitution, Oliver Cromwell was required to nominate a successor, and from 1657 he involved Richard much more heavily in the politics of the regime. He was present at the second installation of his father as Lord Protector in June, having played no part in the first installation. In July he was appointed chancellor of Oxford University, and in December was made a member of the Council of State.

== Lord Protector (1658–59) ==
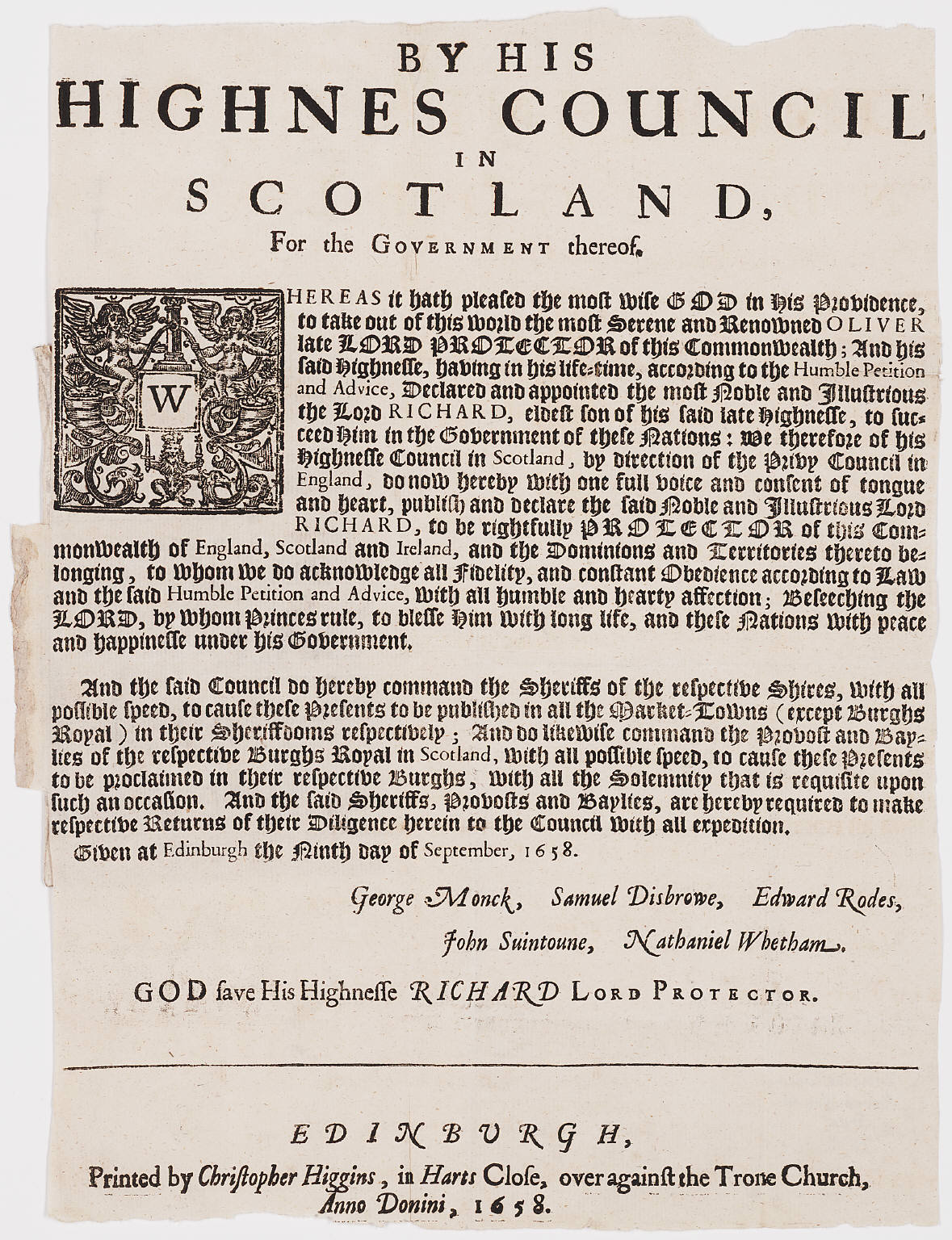
Proclamation announcing the death of Oliver Cromwell and the succession of Richard Cromwell as Lord Protector. Printed in Scotland 1658.

Oliver Cromwell died on 3 September 1658, and Richard was informed on the same day that he was to succeed him. Some controversy surrounds the succession. A letter by John Thurloe suggests that Cromwell nominated his son orally on 30 August, but other theories claim either that he nominated no successor, or that he put forward Charles Fleetwood, his son-in-law.

Richard was faced by two immediate problems. The first was the army, which questioned his position as commander given his lack of military experience. The second was the financial position of the regime, with a debt estimated at £2 million. As a result, Cromwell's privy council decided to call a parliament in order to redress these financial problems on 29 November 1658 (a decision which was formally confirmed on 3 December 1658). Under the terms of the Humble Petition and Advice, this Parliament was called using the traditional franchise (thus moving away from the system under the Instrument of Government whereby representation of rotten boroughs was cut in favour of county constituencies.) This meant that the government was less able to control elections and therefore unable to manage the parliament effectively. As a result, when this Third Protectorate Parliament first sat on 27 January 1659 it was dominated by moderate Presbyterians, crypto-royalists and a small number of vociferous Commonwealthsmen (or Republicans).

The "Other House" of Parliament – a body which had been set up under the Humble Petition and Advice to act as a balance on the Commons – was also revived. It was this second parliamentary chamber and its resemblance to the House of Lords (which had been abolished in 1649) that dominated this Parliamentary session. Republican malcontents gave filibustering speeches about the inadequacy of the membership of this upper chamber (especially its military contingent) and also questioned whether it was indicative of the backsliding of the Protectorate regime in general and its divergence from the "Good Old Cause" for which parliamentarians had originally engaged in civil war. Reviving this House of Lords in all but name, they argued, was but a short step to returning to the Ancient Constitution of King, Lords and Commons.

Coat of arms of the Protectorate, borne by Cromwell during his reign as Lord Protector.

At the same time, the officers of the New Model Army became increasingly wary about the government's commitment to the military cause. The fact that Cromwell lacked military credentials grated with men who had fought on the battlefields of the English Civil War to secure their nation's liberties. Moreover, the new Parliament seemed to show a lack of respect for the army which many military men found alarming. In particular, there were fears that Parliament would make military cuts to reduce costs, and by April 1659 the army's general council of officers had met to demand higher taxation to fund the regime's costs.

Their grievances were expressed in a petition to Cromwell on 6 April 1659 which he forwarded to the Parliament two days later. Yet Parliament did not act on the army's suggestions; instead they shelved this petition and increased the suspicion of the military by bringing articles of impeachment on 12 April 1659 against William Boteler, who was alleged to have mistreated a royalist prisoner while acting as a major-general under Oliver Cromwell in 1655. This was followed by two resolutions in the Commons on 18 April 1659 which stated that no more meetings of army officers should take place without the express permission of both the Lord Protector and Parliament, and that all officers should swear an oath that they would not subvert the sitting of Parliament by force.

These direct affronts to military prestige were too much for the army grandees to bear and set in motion the final split between the civilian-dominated Parliament and the army, which would culminate in the dissolution of Parliament and Cromwell's ultimate fall from power. When Cromwell refused a demand by the army to dissolve Parliament, troops were assembled at St. James's Palace. Cromwell eventually gave in to their demands and on 22 April, Parliament was dissolved and the Rump Parliament recalled on 7 May 1659.

In the subsequent month, Cromwell did not resist and refused an offer of armed assistance from the French ambassador, although it is possible he was being kept under house arrest by the army. On 25 May, after the Rump agreed to pay his debts and provide a pension, Cromwell delivered a formal letter resigning the position of Lord Protector. He told parliament that "I love and value the Peace of this Commonwealth much above my own concernments". "Richard was never formally deposed or arrested, but allowed to fade away. The Protectorate was treated as having been from the first a mere usurpation."

He continued to live in the Palace of Whitehall until July, when he was forced by the Rump to return to Hursley. Royalists rejoiced at Cromwell's fall, and many satirical attacks surfaced, in which he was given the unflattering nicknames "Tumbledown Dick" and "Queen Dick".

== Later years (1659–1712) ==
During the political difficulties of the winter of 1659, there were rumours that Cromwell was to be recalled as Protector, but these came to nothing. In July 1660, Cromwell left for France, never to see his wife again. While there, he went by a variety of pseudonyms, including John Clarke. He later travelled around Europe, visiting various European courts. As a visiting Englishman, he was once invited to dine with Armand de Bourbon, Prince of Conti, who was unaware of who he was. At dinner, the prince questioned Cromwell about affairs in England and observed, "Well, that Oliver, tho' he was a traitor and a villain, was a brave man, had great parts, great courage, and was worthy to command; but that Richard, that coxcomb and poltroon, was surely the basest fellow alive; what is become of that fool?" Cromwell replied, "He was betrayed by those he most trusted, and who had been most obliged by his father." Cromwell departed from the town the following morning. During this period of voluntary exile, he wrote many letters to his family back in England; these letters are now held by Cambridgeshire Archives and Local Studies at the County Record Office in Huntingdon.

In 1680 or 1681, Cromwell returned to England and lodged with the merchant Thomas Pengelly in Cheshunt in Hertfordshire, living off the income from his estate in Hursley. He died on 12 July 1712 at the age of 85. His body was returned to Hursley and interred in a vault beneath All Saints' Parish Church, where a memorial tablet to him has been placed in recent years.

== Fictional portrayals ==
Cromwell has been depicted in historical films. They include Cromwell (1970), where he was portrayed by Anthony May, and To Kill a King (2003), where he was played by John-Paul Macleod. The 1840 historical stage play Master Clarke by Thomas Serle revolves around Cromwell, who was portrayed by William Macready at the Haymarket Theatre.

Cromwell is portrayed in the novels The Last Protector by Andrew Taylor and The Roundheads by Mark Gatiss.

Political offices
| Preceded by Oliver Cromwell | Lord Protector of England, Scotland and Ireland; 3 September 1658 – 25 May 1659 | Succeeded by Council of State |
Academic offices
| Preceded by Oliver Cromwell | Chancellor of the University of Oxford; 1657–1660 | Succeeded by William Seymour |
