= Agnes de Mansfeldt =

1836 novel

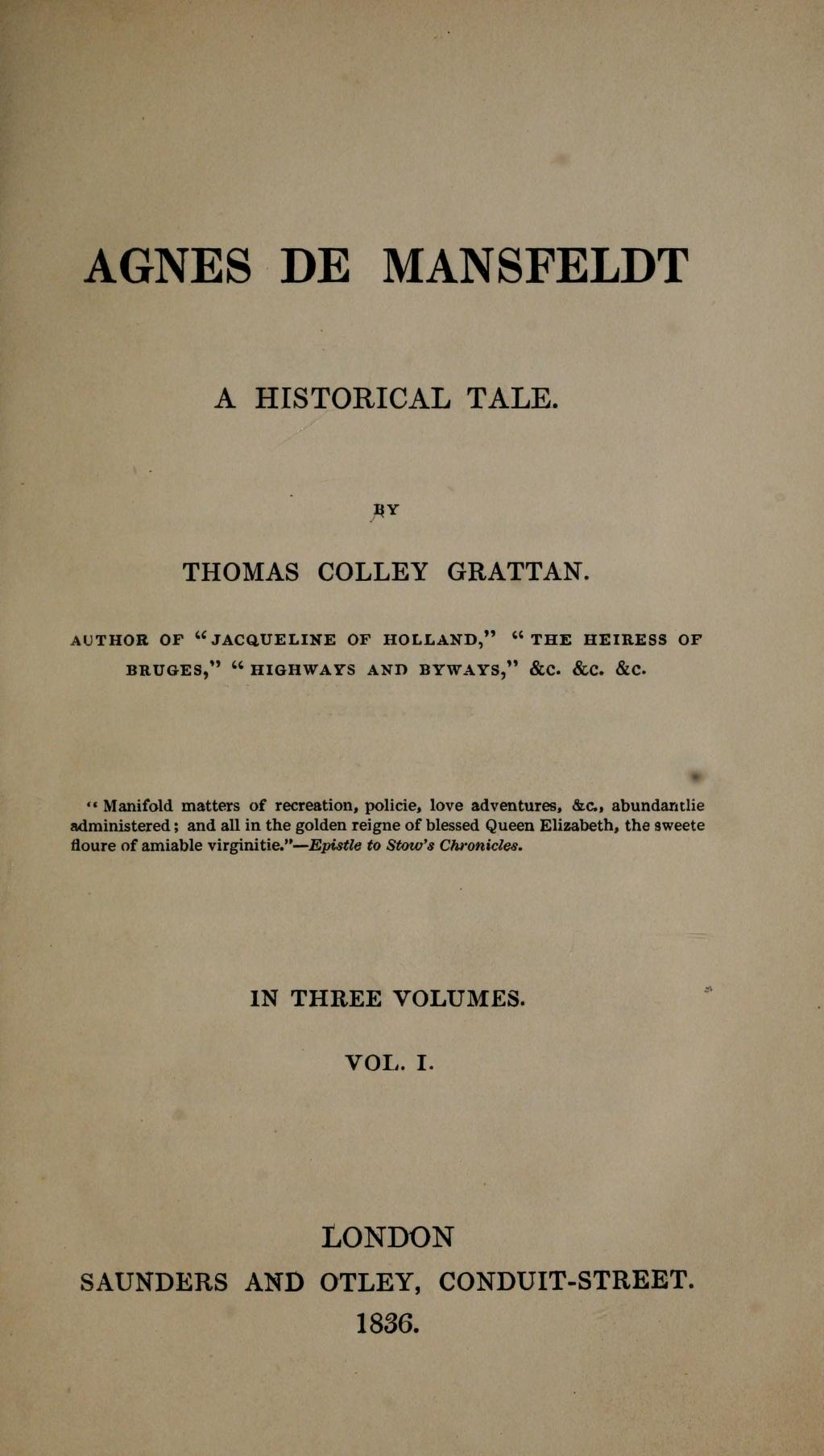
- Author: Thomas Colley Grattan
- Language: English
- Publisher: Saunders and Otley
- Publication date: 1836
- Publication place: United Kingdom
- Media type: Print

Agnes de Mansfeldt is an 1836 historical novel by the Irish writer Thomas Colley Grattan, published in three volumes. It was his third novel, although he remained best known for his travelogues. Like the previous two it was strongly influenced by the Waverley novels of Walter Scott. It is set around the time of the Cologne War of the 1580s, provoked in part by the marriage of Agnes von Mansfeld-Eisleben to the Elector of Cologne and his conversation to Protestantism. In his preface, Grattan draws parallels between these historical events and the contemporary situation following the Belgian Revolution and the 1831 Treaty of London.

== Bibliography ==
- Fenoulhet, Jane, Quist, Gerdi & Tiedau, Ulrich (ed.). Discord and Consensus in the Low Countries, 1700-2000. UCL Press, 2016.
- Loeber, Rolf, Stouthamer-Loeber, Magda & Burnham, Anne Mullin. A Guide to Irish Fiction, 1650-1900. Four Courts, 2006.
