= The Merchant of London =

1832 play

- Original language: English
- Written by: Thomas James Serle
- Genre: Historical
- Setting: London, 16th century

Premiere
- Date: 26 April 1832
- Place: Theatre Royal, Drury Lane, London

The Merchant of London is an 1832 historical play by the British writer Thomas James Serle. It premiered at the Theatre Royal, Drury Lane on 26 April 1832. The original cast included William Macready as Scroope, Henry John Wallack as Edward Beaufort, John Cooper as Richard Fitzalan, John Pritt Harley as Flaw, and Paul Bedford as Bloodmore. It takes place in Elizabethan London.

== Bibliography ==
- Downer, Alan Seymour. The Eminent Tragedian William Charles Macready. Harvard University Press, 1966.
- McWilliam, Rohan. London's West End: Creating the Pleasure District, 1800-1914. Oxford University Press, 2020.
- Nicoll, Allardyce. A History of Early Nineteenth Century Drama 1800-1850. Cambridge University Press, 1930.
