= Conscience (play) =

1821 play

- Original language: English
- Written by: James Haynes
- Genre: Tragedy
- Setting: Venice, Italy

Premiere
- Date: 21 February 1821
- Place: Theatre Royal, Drury Lane, London

Conscience; or, The Bridal Night is an 1821 tragedy by the Irish writer James Haynes. It premiered at the Theatre Royal, Drury Lane in London on 21 February 1821. The original cast included Sarah West as Elmira, John Powell as Duke of Venice, John Cooper as Arsenio, James William Wallack as Lorenzo. It was acted five times on its original run. It then appeared at the Anthony Street Theatre in New York in May 1821. Haynes dedicated the play to James Perry. John Genest considered the play's language better than its plot.

== Bibliography ==
- Genest, John. Some Account of the English Stage: From the Restoration in 1660 to 1830, Volume 9. H.E. Carrington, 1832.
- Nicoll, Allardyce. A History of Early Nineteenth Century Drama 1800-1850. Cambridge University Press, 1930.
- Odell, George Clinton Densmore . Annals of the New York Stage: 1798-1821. AMS Press, 1970.
