= Thomas Colley Grattan =

Irish writer

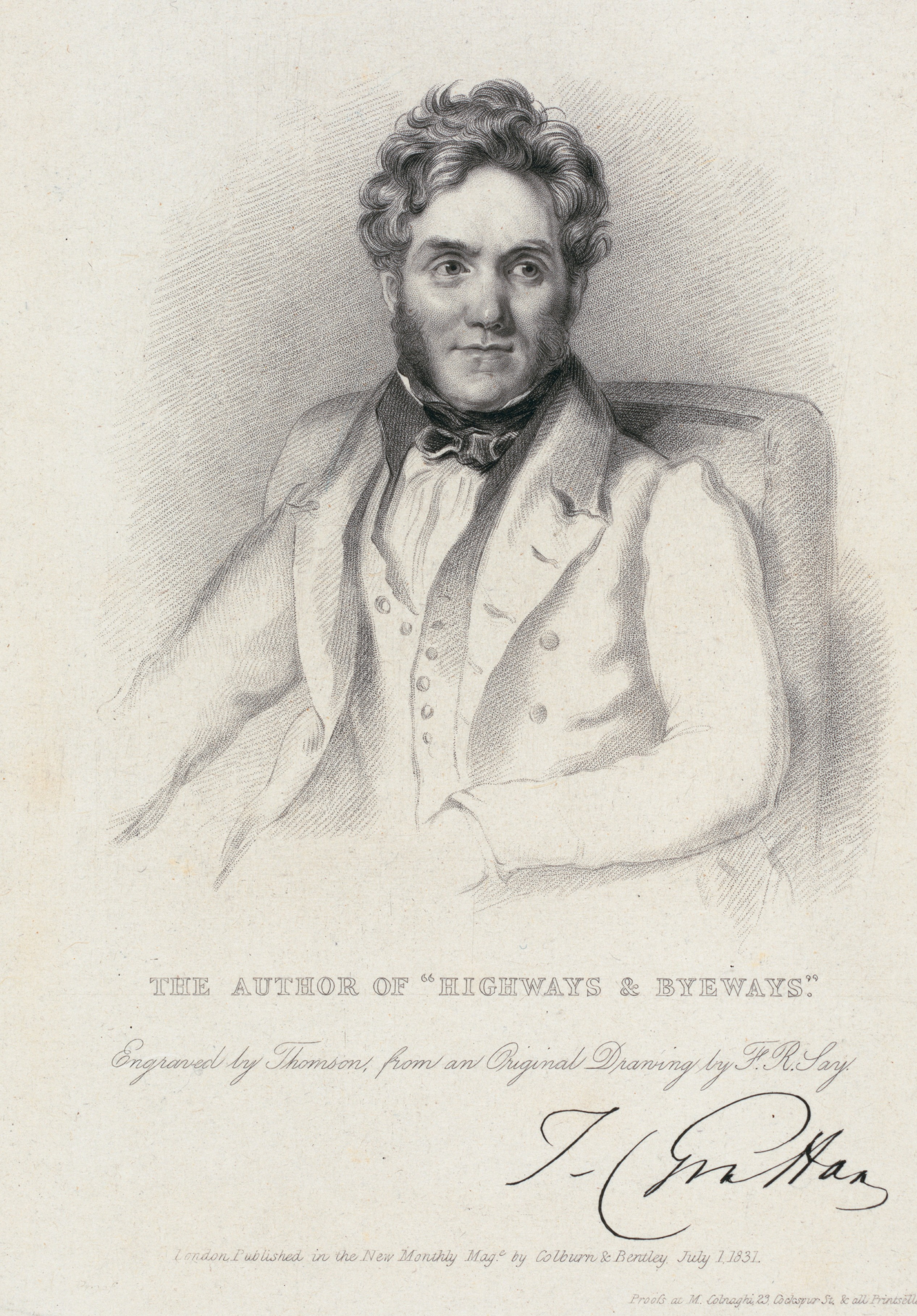
Illustration of Thomas Colley Grattan by Thomas Addis Emmet (1880).

Thomas Colley Grattan (1792 – 4 July 1864) was an Irish novelist, poet, dramatist, travel writer, historian and diplomat. Born in Dublin, he was educated for the law, but did not practise. He wrote a few novels, including The Heiress of Bruges (4 volumes, 1830); but his best work was Highways and Byways, a description of his Continental travels, of which he published three series, amounting to eight volumes. He also wrote a history of the Netherlands and books on America. He was for some time British Consul at Boston in the United States and assisted in the negotiations leading to the Webster–Ashburton Treaty in 1842.

== Life ==
Grattan was son of Colley Grattan of Clayton Lodge, County Kildare, a solicitor in Dublin who became a farmer, and his wife Elizabeth Warren. The family was part of the Anglo-Irish Protestant Ascendancy and Grattan was related to both the Irish politician Henry Grattan and the Duke of Wellington. He was educated in Athy by the Reverend Henry Bristow, after which he was sent to Dublin to study law. He then accepted a commission in the Louth militia. In 1810, while stationed in Waterford, he met the actor Edmund Kean following a performance of Hamlet. The two became friends, and years later Grattan wrote a play for him.

After leaving the army, Grattan decided to take part in the South American wars of independence. He embarked for Bordeaux in 1818, with the intention of taking a ship from there to Venezuela, but on his passage met Eliza O'Donnel. He married her and settled near Bordeaux. It was here that he started as a writer, beginning with Philibert, an octo-syllabic poem in six cantos. Soon after he moved to Paris, where he met Thomas Moore, Washington Irving, Adolphe Thiers, Béranger, Lamartine, and other distinguished literary men, and became a steady contributor to the Westminster Review, Edinburgh Review, the New Monthly Magazine, and other periodicals. His translations from French poets were successful. He also ran a serial of his own, The Paris Monthly Review of British and Continental Literature, by a Society of English Gentlemen. No. 1 came out in January 1822, and No. 15 (April 1823) appears to have been the last issue of this magazine. By Washington Irving's advice he edited notes of some of his tours, and submitted the manuscript to four publishing houses, who all rejected it. This work was Highways and Byways, or Tales of the Roadside,’ which, on its appearance in 1823, dedicated to Washington Irving, made its author's name widely known both in England and on the continent, and was several times reprinted. The second series of these tales came out in 1825, and the third in 1827. Grattan's next public appearance was as the writer of a tragedy, Ben Nazir, the Saracen. This was produced by Kean at Drury Lane Theatre on 21 May 1827, but the actor, through ill-health and domestic misfortunes, broke down, and the play failed with him.

With money troubles, Grattan moved to Brussels in about 1828. He there produced Traits of Travel, which was well received; The Heiress of Bruges, a historical romance; and The History of the Netherlands, became a standard work. In 1830 the revolution drove him from Brussels; his house was almost destroyed by cannon and his property was pillaged. He retired to Antwerp, and accompanied the Prince of Orange from that city to The Hague, where he wrote Jacqueline of Holland. In May 1831 he was at Heidelberg, where he composed the Legends of the Rhine. About the same time (1832) he was appointed gentleman of the privy chamber to William IV. Returning to Brussels he was well received by King Leopold, and henceforth for some years again resided in Belgium. He was now a frequent contributor to the British and foreign reviews, writing on the state of European affairs, mainly in connection with Belgium.

At a critical moment in the affairs of the new kingdom, during the riots at Brussels in 1834, Grattan began a correspondence with The Times newspaper, and his letters were translated and reproduced in continental journals. His services were acknowledged by Leopold, and partly owing to his influence he, in 1839, received the appointment of British consul to the state of Massachusetts. He moved in the summer of that year, and took up his residence at Boston. At this period the controversy between the American states and the British provinces relative to the north-eastern boundary was the absorbing topic. Grattan made himself completely master of the subject, and communicated his opinions to Lord Ashburton when that nobleman arrived in the United States in 1842 as minister plenipotentiary for the purpose of settling the boundary question. Grattan was unanimously chosen by both parties to assist at the negotiations at Washington, and contributed to the conclusion of the treaty of 9 April 1842. In the United States Grattan gained considerable reputation as a speaker and raconteur.

Returning to England in 1846 Grattan was permitted, in consideration of his services, to resign his consulship in favour of his eldest son Edmund Grattan. From this period he mainly resided in London, where he resumed his literary labours, and among other works produced, in 2 vols., in 1862, Beaten Paths and those who trod them, which contains autobiographical recollections.

Grattan died at his residence in Jermyn Street, London, 4 July 1864.

== Family ==
In 1818 he married Eliza Sarah O'Donnel; they had three sons and a daughter.

== Works ==
1. Philibert, a Poetical Romance, Bordeaux, 1819.
2. Highways and Byways, or Tales of the Roadside picked up in the French Provinces by a Walking Gentleman, 1823, 2 vols.; 2nd series, 1825, 3 vols., and 3rd series, 1827, 3 vols.
3. The History of Switzerland (anon.), 1825.
4. Ben Nazir, the Saracen, a Tragedy, 1827.
5. Traits of Travel, or Tales of Men and Cities, 1829, 3 vols.
6. The History of the Netherlands to the Belgium Revolution in 1830 (Lardner's Cyclopædia vol. x. 1830).
7. The Heiress of Bruges, a Tale of the Year Sixteen Hundred, 1830.
8. Jacqueline of Holland, an Historical Tale, 1831, 3 vols.
9. Legends of the Rhine and of the Low Countries, 1832, 3 vols.
10. Agnes de Mansfeldt, an Historical Tale, 1836, 3 vols.
11. The Boundary Question raised and Dr. Franklin's Red Line shown to be the right one, by a British subject, New York, 1843.
12. The Master Passion and other Tales, 1845, 3 vols.
13. Chance Medley of Light Matter, 1845.
14. The Cagot's Hut and the Conscript's Bride, 1852 ('Parlour Library,’ No. 82).
15. The Forfeit Hand and other Tales, 1857 ('Parlour Library,’ No. 163).
16. Curse of the Black Lady and other Tales, 1857 ('Parlour Library,’ No. 165).
17. Civilised America, 1859, 2 vols.
18. England and the Disrupted States of America, 1861.
19. Beaten Paths and those who trod them, 1862, 2 vols.

Many of these works have been reprinted in various forms.

== Bibliography ==
- Fenoulhet, Jane, Quist, Gerdi & Tiedau, Ulrich (ed.). Discord and Consensus in the Low Countries, 1700–2000. UCL Press, 2016.
- Van Doorslaer, Luc, Flynn, Peter & Leerssen, Joep (ed.). Interconnecting Translation Studies and Imagology. John Benjamins Publishing Company, 2016.

Attribution

- This article incorporates text from a publication now in the public domain: Stephen, Leslie; Lee, Sidney, eds. (1890). "Grattan, Thomas Colley". Dictionary of National Biography. Vol. 22. London: Smith, Elder & Co.
