= Dorothy Maijor =

Wife of Richard Cromwell

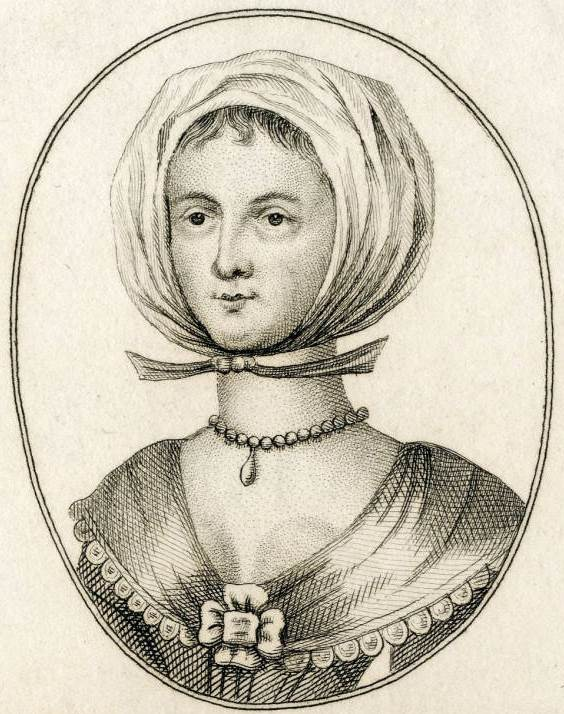
Engraving of Dorothy Maijor by unknown artist

Dorothy Cromwell (née Maijor; c.1620 – 5 January 1675) was the wife of the second Lord Protector, Richard Cromwell, who succeeded to the post in 1659 following the death of his father, Oliver Cromwell.

== Life ==
Dorothy or Dorothea Maijor was the daughter of Richard Maijor, Esq of Hursley in Hampshire.

In 1649, Richard Cromwell married Dorothy Maijor. He and his wife continued to stay at Richard Maijor's estate at Hursley. During the 1650s, they had nine children, five of whom survived to adulthood.

After Richard fled the country, Dorothy remained loyal to him and spent fifteen years of her life awaiting his return, only to die on 5 January 1675.

== Duties ==
Although very little of her is known and published, she was known to be present at her husband's investment ceremony at Westminster Hall and may have been called 'protectress', though it appears she undertook very few duties during Richard's short nine-month reign.
