= Charles the First (Mitford play) =

1834 play

- Original language: English
- Written by: Mary Russell Mitford
- Genre: Tragedy
- Setting: London and Isle of Wight 1640s

Premiere
- Date: 2 July 1834
- Place: Royal Victoria Theatre, London

Charles the First is a historical tragedy by the British writer Mary Russell Mitford. It depicts the imprisonment and trial of Charles I before his execution in 1649 following his defeat in the English Civil Wars. It was first written in 1825 and originally intended to be performed at Covent Garden. Mitford wrote the play with the encouragement of William Macready and Charles Kemble, the two leading performers at Covent Garden. However, the politically controversial topic of regicide led to it being refused a licence by the Lord Chamberlain, the Duke of Montrose.

It was not performed until 1834 at the Victoria Theatre south of the River Thames, a less prestigious venue than Covent Garden but not subject to the licensing system. It passed off without incident and was both a popular and critical success. It premiered on 2 July 1834. William Abbot, a co-manager of the Victoria, played the title role of Charles while Charles Selby was Lord Fairfax. Other performers were less well-known than the company at Covent Garden would have been. It was published the same year, and was dedicated to her friend and fellow playwright Thomas Talfourd.

== Bibliography ==
- Burwick, Frederick Goslee, Nancy Moore & Hoeveler Diane Long. The Encyclopedia of Romantic Literature. John Wiley & Sons, 2012.
- Hoagwood, Terence Allan & Watkins, Daniel P. (ed.) British Romantic Drama: Historical and Critical Essay. Fairleigh Dickinson University Press, 1998.
- Nicoll, Allardyce. A History of Early Nineteenth Century Drama 1800-1850. Cambridge University Press, 1930.
