= Alfred the Great (play) =

1831 play

- Original language: English
- Written by: James Sheridan Knowles
- Genre: Tragedy

Premiere
- Date: 28 April 1831
- Place: Theatre Royal, Drury Lane, London

Alfred the Great is an 1831 historical play by the Irish writer James Sheridan Knowles. It portrays the life of the Anglo-Saxon King Alfred the Great.

It premiered at the Theatre Royal, Drury Lane in London. The title role was played by William Macready, a frequent collaborator of Knowles. Other members of the cast included Charles Mayne Young as Edric, John Cooper as Guthrum, James Vining as Oddune, Henry John Wallack as Oswith, Mary Warner as Elswith and Thomas Cooke as Kenric. The published version was dedicated to the reigning monarch William IV.

== Bibliography ==
- Sebastian I. Sobecki. The Sea and Englishness in the Middle Ages: Maritime Narratives, Identity and Culture. Boydell & Brewer, 2011.
