= Arthur Brooke Faulkner =

Irish physician

Sir Arthur Brooke Faulkner (1779–23 May 1845) was an Irish medical doctor to the forces, and writer.

== Life ==
He was the youngest son of Hugh Faulkner of Castletown, co. Carlow, his mother having been a Cole of the family of Enniskillen. He entered Trinity College, Dublin, in 1795, and graduated with a BA. He studied chemistry, anatomy and dissection. He then studied medicine at the University of Edinburgh graduating with an MD in 1803. His next two years were spent in London in attendance at the London Hospital, the Westminster Hospital, and the Surrey Dispensary. In 1805 he was incorporated BA of Catharine Hall, Cambridge, by virtue of his Dublin degree, and MA the same year; his Cambridge MA degree served to procure him the ad eundem degree of Dublin, and finally he used his MA degree of Dublin to get incorporated MB of Pembroke College, Oxford, on 11 July 1806, and MD the day after.

In 1807 he became a candidate of the College of Physicians of London, and was elected fellow in 1808. He was appointed physician to the forces and served on the staff in Spain, Holland, Sicily, and Malta. He was at Malta when the plague was introduced there in 1813 (after an interval of 140 years) by a vessel from Alexandria; he distinguished himself by tracing the spread of the disease, by his vigorous advocacy of the doctrine of contagion, and by directing the quarantine procedure whereby the disease was kept within bounds. Returning to England he was knighted in February 1815 and appointed physician to the Duke of Sussex.

Having retired from the service in 1815, he settled as a physician at Cheltenham, and died at his residence at Evington, near Cheltenham, 23 May 1845, aged 66. In 1810 he married a daughter of Mr Donald M'Leod.

== Works ==
In 1810 he published a tract, 'Considerations on the Expediency of Establishing an Hospital for Officers on Foreign Service.' He communicated his experiences of plague to the 'Edinburgh Medical and Surgical Journal,’ April 1814, gave evidence in favour of its contagiousness before the House of Commons' committee in 1819, and published a full account of the Malta outbreak in 1820 ('Treatise on the Plague,’ &c. London).

Apart from his profession he was known as an entertaining narrator of continental travel. He published three works of that kind: 'Rambling Notes and Reflections,’ London, 1827 (visit to France); 'Visit to Germany and the Low Countries,’ 1829–30–1831, 2 vols. London, 1833; and 'Letters to Lord Brougham,’ London, 1837 (visit to Italy). These writings are excellent of their kind, and are interspersed with many remarks on home affairs, which, as he says, 'have no more to do with a tour to Paris than with the discovery of the north-west passage,’ but are inserted with 'an atrocious obstinacy proceeding from the hope of doing some good, against the clear evidence of all experience to the contrary.' Out of these remarks sprang the following pamphlets: 'Reply to Clerical Objections,' 1828; 'Letters to the College of Physicians,' 1829 (advising them to give up antiquated privileges and assume new duties); 'Letter to the Lord Chancellor,' 1834 (protesting against Brougham's defence of the established church and advocating 'a reform in the ministrations of a religion of which your lordship's life is a conspicuous ornament'); and a 'Letter to the Archbishop of Canterbury,' 1840 (on such grievances as non-residence of the clergy and the flight of the Bishop of Gloucester and Bristol to Malvern when the cholera was in Bristol in 1832). Describing his own subscription at Oxford, he says: 'Down went my name, and down went my fees; and the degree was forthcoming, signed, sealed, and delivered, with a bouquet of flowers to boot.' His political creed was that 'as sure as a lobster turns red by boiling, a whig grows tory when long in power. . . .' In 1829 he reflects on 'the sub-acid dissenter of the old school railing at our church,' but in his letter to Brougham (1834) he argues for disestablishment. His most entertaining work, the 'Visit to Germany' (1833), is dedicated to the Duke of Sussex, whom he claims as in sympathy with his general views and as an enemy of 'obscurantism.'
