= Mary Russell Mitford =

English writer (1787–1855)

Mary Mitford
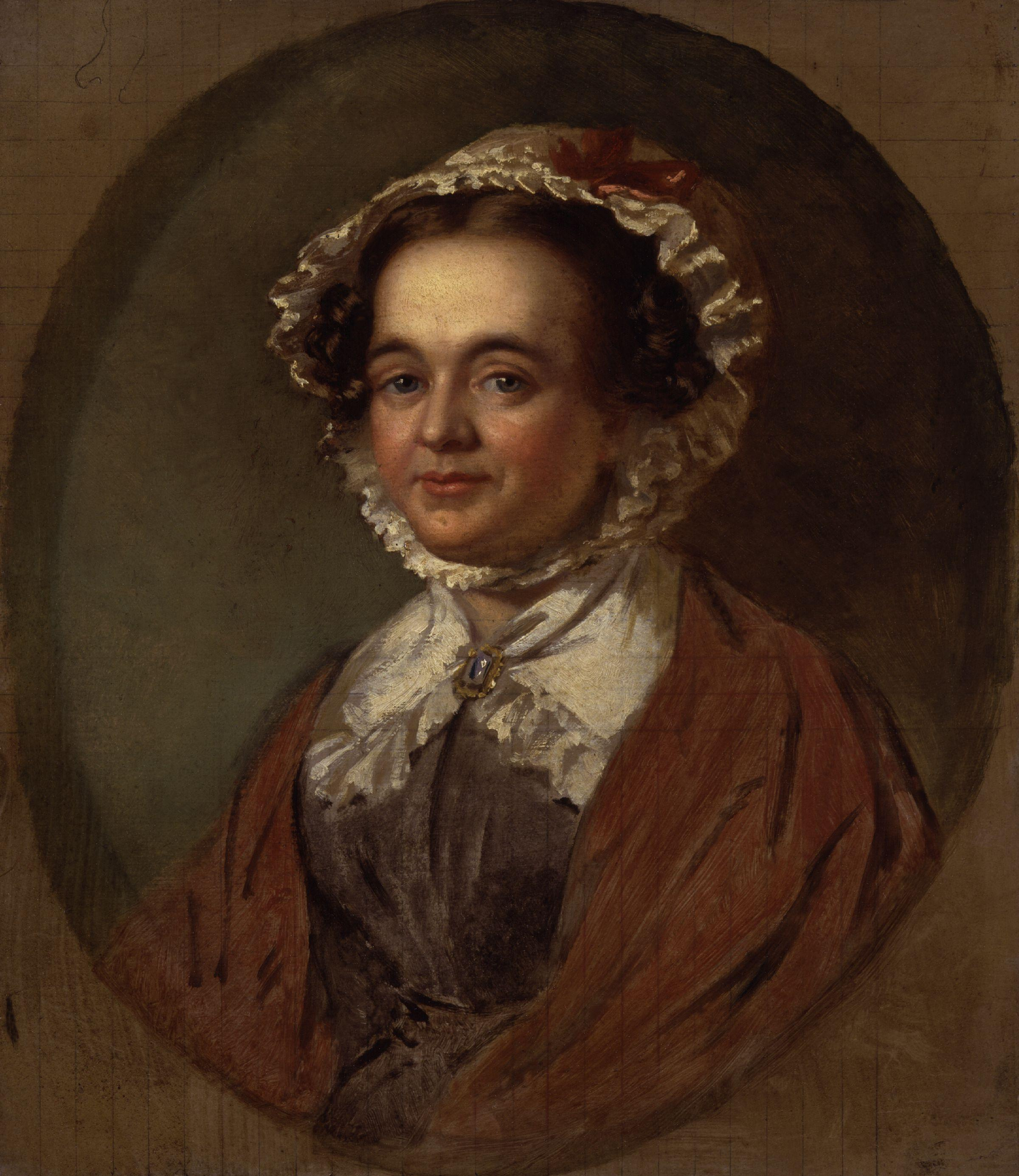
- Mitford by Benjamin Haydon, 1824
- Born: 16 December 1787; New Alresford, England, Great Britain
- Died: 10 January 1855 (aged 67); Swallowfield, England, British Empire
- Resting place: Swallowfield, England, United Kingdom
- Occupation: Novelist
- Parent(s): George M. Mary Russell

Mary Russell Mitford (16 December 1787 – 10 January 1855) was an English essayist, novelist, poet and dramatist. She was born in New Alresford in Hampshire, England. She is best known for Our Village, a series of sketches of village scenes and vividly drawn characters based upon her life in Three Mile Cross near Reading in Berkshire.

== Childhood ==
Mary Mitford as a young girl

She was the only daughter of George Mitford (or Midford), who apparently trained as a medical doctor, and Mary Russell, a descendant of the aristocratic Russell family. She grew up near Jane Austen and was an acquaintance of hers when young. She was also a close friend of Elizabeth Browning and gave her a Cocker Spaniel named Flush in 1840.

In 1797, 10-year-old Mary won her father a lottery ticket worth £20,000, but by the 1810s the small family suffered financial difficulties. In the 1800s and 1810s they lived in large properties in Reading and then Grazeley (in Sulhamstead Abbots parish), but, when the money was all gone after 1819, they lived on a small remnant of the doctor's lost fortune and the proceeds of his daughter's literary career. He is thought to have inspired Mary with the keen delight in incongruities, the lively sympathy, self-willed vigorous individuality, and tolerance which inspire so many of her sketches of character. She cared for her mother and father until their deaths and supported them and herself by proceeds from her writing.

From age 10 to 15 she attended a school in Hans Place, Knightsbridge, London, the successor to Reading Abbey Girls' School, which Austen had attended a few years earlier. Her father engaged Frances Rowden, formerly governess to the family of Frederick Ponsonby, to give her extra tuition. Rowden was not only a published poet, but according to Mitford, "she had a knack of making poetesses of her pupils". Rowden took Mitford to Theatre Royal, Drury Lane, especially to plays featuring John Kemble, and entranced her with the life of the theatre.

== Works ==
Mitford's youthful ambition had been to be the greatest English poetess, and her first publications were poems in the manner of Samuel Coleridge and Walter Scott (Miscellaneous Verses, 1810, reviewed by Scott in the Quarterly; Christina, the Maid of the South Seas, a metrical tale based on the first news of discovery of the last surviving mutineer of the H. M. S. Bounty and a generation of British-Tahitian children on Pitcairn Island in 1811; and Blanche, part of a projected series of "Narrative Poems on the Female Character", in 1813). Her play Julian was produced at Covent Garden, with William Charles Macready in the title role, in 1823; Foscari at Covent Garden, with Charles Kemble as the hero, in 1826; while Rienzi, 1828, the best of her plays, ran for 34 performances, and Mitford's friend, Thomas Talfourd, supposed that its popularity detracted from the success of his own play, Ion. Charles the First was refused a licence by the Lord Chamberlain, but was played at the Surrey Theatre in 1834.

The prose, to which she was driven by the need to earn a living, was the most successful and financially rewarding of her literary productions. The first series of Our Village sketches appeared in book form in 1824 (having first appeared in The Lady's Magazine five years previously), a second in 1826, a third in 1828, a fourth in 1830, a fifth in 1832. They were reprinted several times. Belford Regis, another series of literary sketches in which the neighbourhood and society of Reading were idealised, was published in 1835. Her description of village cricket in Our Village has been called "the first major prose on the game".

Her Recollections of a Literary Life (1852) is a series of causeries about her favourite books. Her talk was said by her friends, Elizabeth Browning and Hengist Horne, to have been even more amusing than her books, and five volumes of her Life and Letters, published in 1870 and 1872, show her to have been a delightful letter-writer. The many collections available of her letters provide especially useful commentary and criticism of her Romantic and Victorian literary contemporaries.

== Reception ==
Mitford was a prolific and successful writer, though the quality of her prose has elicited mixed opinions. In his introduction to a 1997 reprint of selections from Our Village, Ronald Blythe stated that "it is hard to know what to praise most, her style or her spirit. Both rise to heights rarely found either in the women's journalism of her day or in a woman who by every law of the time should have been crushed by adversity." On the other hand, Tom Fort, writing in 2017, took the view that "for a reader of today she is rather hard going ... She is, I'm sorry to say, trite, sentimental, long-winded, short-sighted, arch, chatty and twee."

Esther Meynell's 1939 novel English Spinster: a portrait is a fictional treatment of the life of Mary Russell Mitford.

== Bibliography ==
- 1810: Miscellaneous Poems
- 1811: Christina, the Maid of the South Seas (poetry)
- 1812: Watlington Hill
- 1812: Blanch of Castile
- 1813: Narrative Poems on the Female Character
- 1823: Julian: A tragedy (play)
- 1824: Our Village, Volume 1 (Volume 2 1826; Volume 3, 1828; Volume 4, 1830; Volume 5, 1832)
- 1826: Foscari: A tragedy (play)
- 1827: Dramatic Scenes, Sonnets, and other Poems
- 1828: Rienzi: A tragedy in five acts (play)
- 1830: Editor, Stories of American Life, by American Writers, Volume 2
- 1831: Mary Queen of Scots
- 1831: American Stories for Little Boys and Girls (Editor)
- 1832: Tales for Young People (Editor)
- 1832: Lights and Shadows of American life (Editor)
- 1834: Charles the First: An historical tragedy (play)
- 1835: Sadak and Kalascado
- 1835: Belford Regis; or, Sketches of a Country Town (in three volumes)
- 1837: Country Stories
- 1852: Recollections of a Literary Life, or Books, Places and People (three volumes)
- 1854: Atherton, and Other Tales (three volumes)
- 1854: Dramatic Works

== Later life and death ==
Mitford met Elizabeth Barrett Browning in 1836 and their acquaintance ripened into a warm friendship.

The strain of poverty told on Mitford's work, for although her books sold at high prices, her income did not keep pace with her father's extravagances. In 1837, however, she received a civil list pension, and five years later, on 11 December 1842, her father died. A subscription was raised to pay his debts, and the surplus increased Mary's income.

In 1851 she moved from Three Mile Cross to a cottage in Swallowfield, three miles away, where she remained for the rest of her life. She died there on 10 January 1855, after being injured in a carriage accident the previous December. She was buried there in the churchyard.

== Legacy ==
Her life was dramatised in the 1940 Australian radio play Three Mile Cross by Catherine Shepherd.

== Literature ==
- The Life of Mary Russell Mitford, related in a Selection from her Letters, 3 vols (1870 Bentley).
- Henry Fothergill Chorley (Ed.), Letters of Mary Russell Mitford (1872).
- A.G.K. L'Estrange (Ed.), The Friendships of Mary Russell Mitford as recorded in Letters from Her Literary Correspondents, 2 vols (1882 Hurst & Blackett).
- William J. Roberts, (The Life and Friendships of) Mary Russell Mitford: The Tragedy of a Blue Stocking (Andrew Melrose, London 1913). (Modern publishing: Kessinger 2007, ISBN 0-548-60938-1)
- M. Constance Hill, Mary Russell Mitford and Her Surroundings (Bodley Head, London 1920).
- Marjorie Astin, Mary Russell Mitford – Her Circle and Her Books (Noel Douglas, London 1930).
- James E. Agate, Mary Russell Mitford (1940).
- Vera G. Watson, Mary Russell Mitford (Evans Brothers, 1949).
- Caroline Mary Duncan-Jones, Miss Mitford and Mr. Harness. Records of a Friendship. (S.P.C.K./Talbot Press, London 1955).
- W.A. Coles, 'Mary Russell Mitford: the inauguration of a literary career', Journal of the John Rylands Library 40 (1957), 33–46.
- Pamela Horn (Ed.), Life in a Country Town: Reading and Mary Russell Mitford (1787–1855) (Beacon Publications, Sutton Courtenay 1984).
- Catherine Addison, 'Gender and Genre in Mary Russell Mitford's Christina,' English Studies in Africa 41, Part 2 (1998), 1–21.
- Diego Saglia, 'Public and Private in Women's Romantic Poetry: Spaces, Gender, Genre in Mary Russell Mitford's Blanch,' Women's Writing 5.3 (1998), 405–19.
- Martin Garrett, 'Mary Russell Mitford', Oxford Dictionary of National Biography, 2004.
- Diego Saglia, 'Mediterranean Unrest: 1820s Verse Tragedies and Revolutions in the South,' Romanticism 11.1 (2005) 99–113.
- Alison Booth, 'Revisiting the Homes and Haunts of Mary Russell Mitford', Nineteenth Century Contexts, 30 Part 1 (2008), 39–65.
- Cecilia Pietropoli, 'The Story of the Foscaris, a Drama for Two Playwrights: Mary Mitford and Lord Byron,' in The Language of Performance in British Romanticism (Peter Lang, New York, 2008), 115–26.
- Elisa Beshero-Bondar, 'Romancing the Pacific Isles Before Byron: Music, Sex, and Death in Mitford's Christina,' ELH 76.2 (Summer 2009) 277–308.
