= Arborfield Studios =

British film and television studio

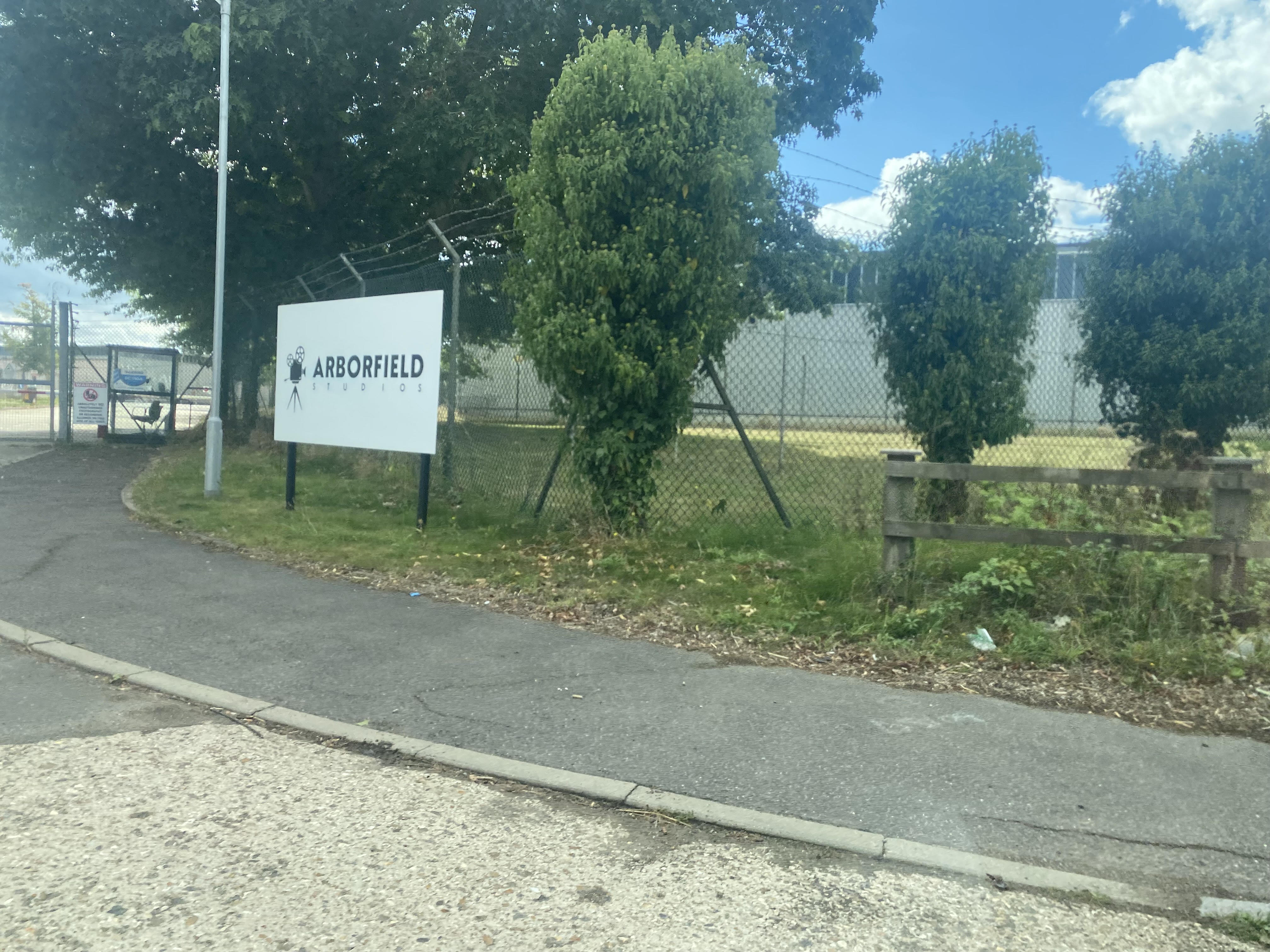
- Arborfield Studios entrance sign
- Interactive map of the Arborfield Studios area

General information
- Location: Arborfield, England, Langley Common Road, Arborfield, Berkshire, RG40 4TS
- Coordinates: 51.3917°N 0.8964°W
- Opened: 2017
- Owner: Longcross Studios

Website
- Arborfield Studios

Arborfield Studios is a film and television studio located in Arborfield, Berkshire, England. It is located about 9 kilometres (5.6 mi) from central Reading and 4 kilometres (2.5 mi) from Shinfield Studios. Managed by Longcross Studios, the studios have been used for productions by Netflix and Disney.

== History ==
Arborfield Studios are located on a site which was previously part of the Arborfield Garrison which was established in 1904 for the Army Remount Service. After WW2, it served as the depot of the Royal Electrical and Mechanical Engineers and housed the REME Museum. The military left in 2015, and the potential of the large hangars for film production was recognised.

In 2016, the DIO developed the site, and plans were approved on 2 February 2017 to convert a section of the disused barracks into a film studio. The studios partnered with Sohonet at the end of 2017.

The temporary planning permission expires on 1 February 2026, leaving the Studios future uncertain.

== Facilities ==
Arborfield Studios offers a total of three filming stages. The stages vary significantly in size:

- Stage 1: Approximately 70,000 sq ft (tallest working height: 39 ft)
- Stage 2: Approximately 13,200 sq ft (tallest working height: 26 ft)
- Stage 3: Approximately 13,500 sq ft (tallest working height: 29 ft)
- Stages 4, 5, and 6 are smaller, with areas ranging from 7,100 to 16,000 sq ft and heights up to 35 ft. And are used as supplementary warehourses, offices, workshops and amenities.

The studios provide extensive space for various production needs, including: Wardrobe, Art department, Construction, Props, Office space, Editorial/VFX suites and two backlot areas (approx. 90,000 sq ft and 50,000 sq ft) suitable for building exterior sets.

== Productions ==
=== Film ===
- Aladdin (2019)
- Jingle Jangle: A Christmas Journey (2020)
- Bugonia (2025)
- Stuntnuts: The Movie (TBA)

=== Television series ===
- The Witcher (2021)
- The Witcher: Blood Origin (2022)
- Star Wars: The Acolyte (2024)
