= Shinfield Studios =

British film and television studio

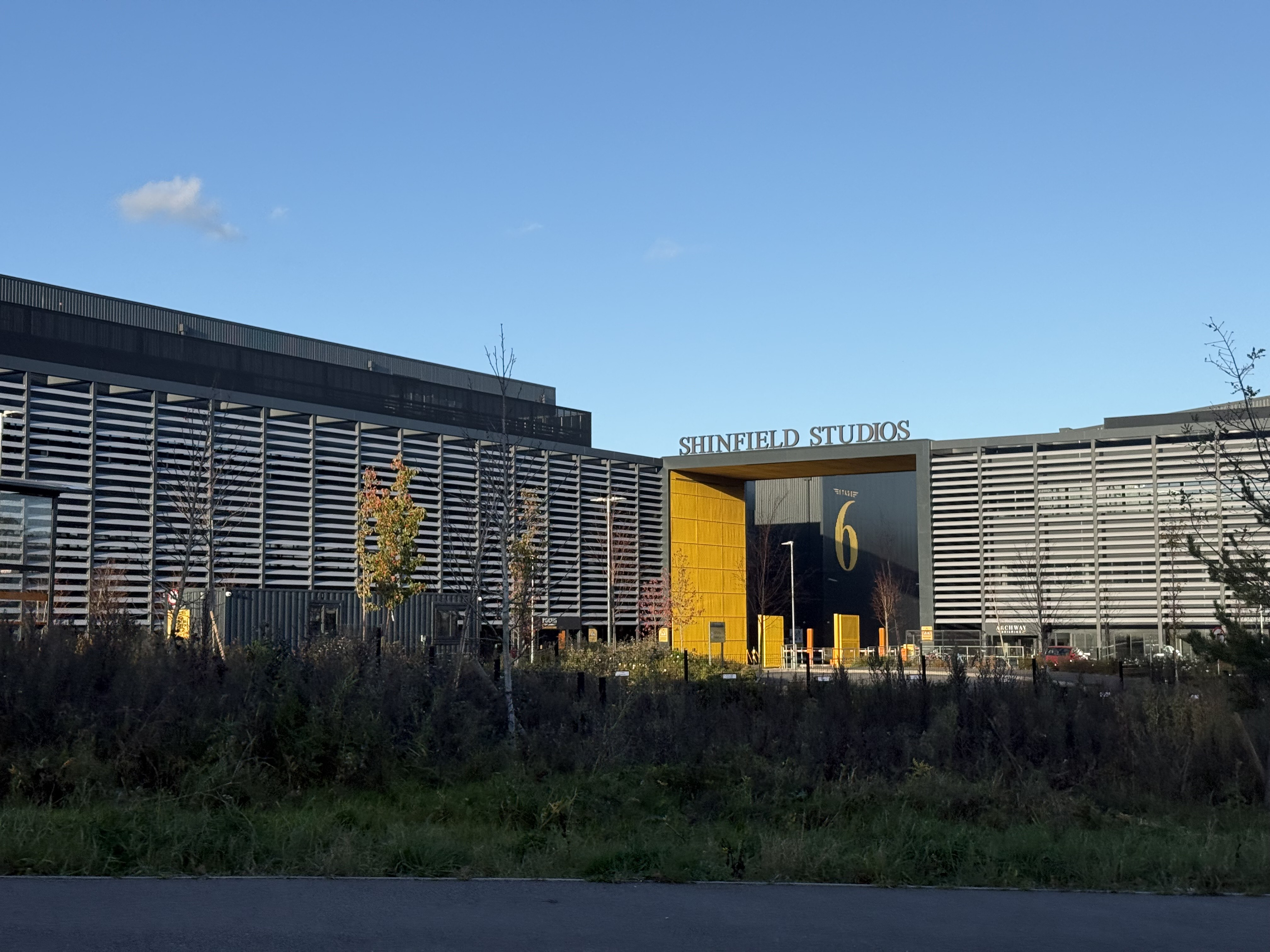
- Shinfield Studios entrance

General information
- Location: South Avenue, Shinfield, Berkshire, RG2 9LH
- Coordinates: 51.415496°N 0.938695°W
- Opening: 2021 (fully completed by 2024)
- Owner: Shadowbox Studios

Design and construction
- Architect: Scott Brownrigg

Website
- Shinfield Studios

Shinfield Studios, branded as Shadowbox Studios Shinfield, is a film and television studio located in Shinfield, Berkshire, England. Located approximately 35 miles (56 km) from Central London, the studio is owned by Shadowbox Studios and finished construction in spring 2024. It is part of the newly emerging British film studios that have worked with major Hollywood studios, including Netflix, Lucasfilm and Sony.

== Geography ==
Shinfield Studios is located on the rapidly expanding University of Reading owned site, Thames Valley Science Park (TVSP), near the village of Shinfield. This area is a growing hub, currently hosting of the British Museum, with a Natural History Museum laboratory and storehouse under construction. The studio complex is easily accessible as it is located just off the M4 motorway. Therefore, the journey time from Heathrow Airport is 30 minutes by car or an hour by train. The studios are also served by the Reading Buses Leopard 3 bus which stops at the TVSP.

== History ==
=== Planning ===
In February 2020, the University of Reading announced their agreement with Blackhall Studios to construct a large-scale film production complex on the university-owned land at Thames Valley Science Park, adjacent to the M4 motorway near Junction 11. The Studios were originally meant to be called Cine Valley Studios, however following public consultation they decided on the name Shinfield Studios.

In January 2021, a 'Screening Opinion' was submitted to Wokingham Borough Council and planning permission was granted for four temporary soundstages, similar to Arborfield Studios, in March that year. However, on 28 May 2021, full planning permission was submitted to replace the temporary ones. This was approved by the council on the 13th of October 2021, a unanimous vote.

=== Construction ===
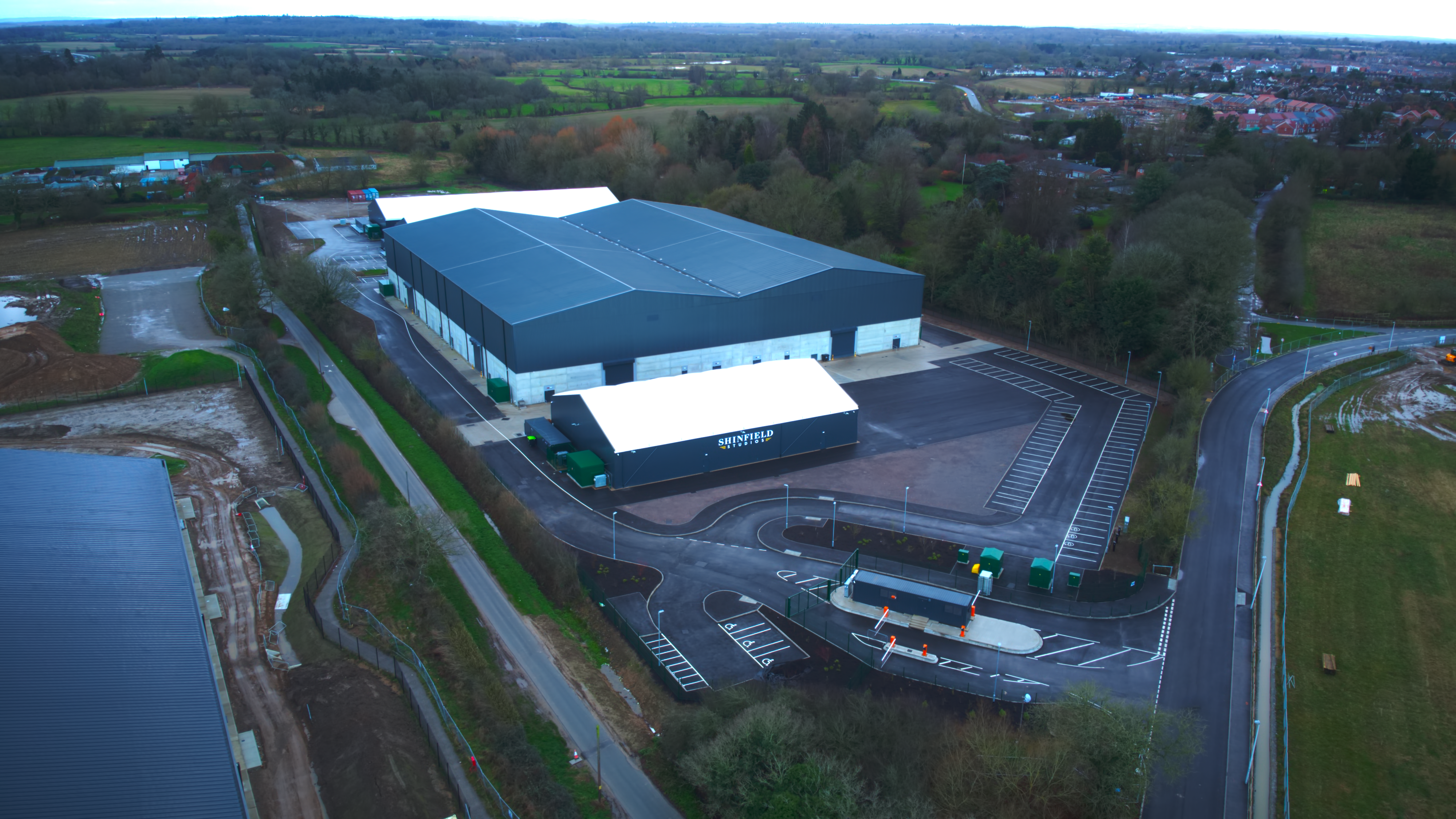
Shinfield Studios Phase 1

Phase 1 began with the 4 temporary stages were constructed in 2021, however the joint managing director of Shinfield Studios, Nick Smith, announced that they are permanent and have been used for filming. Curo Construction and LIFE Build oversaw the construction of the Studios. Construction occurred over multiple phases allowing productions to be made during construction. Phase 2 began construction in December 2021 and completed in spring 2023. The whole site was fully completed and handed over by spring 2024.

=== Present day ===
The studios have worked alongside the University of Reading and the British Film Institute to help develop the Screen Berkshire training programme.

The studio was shortlisted for the Studio of the Year for the 2025 Global Production Awards. On the 26 June 2025, Shinfield Studios successfully secured a £250 million refinancing package with Apollo Global Management as the new lender.

== Facilities ==
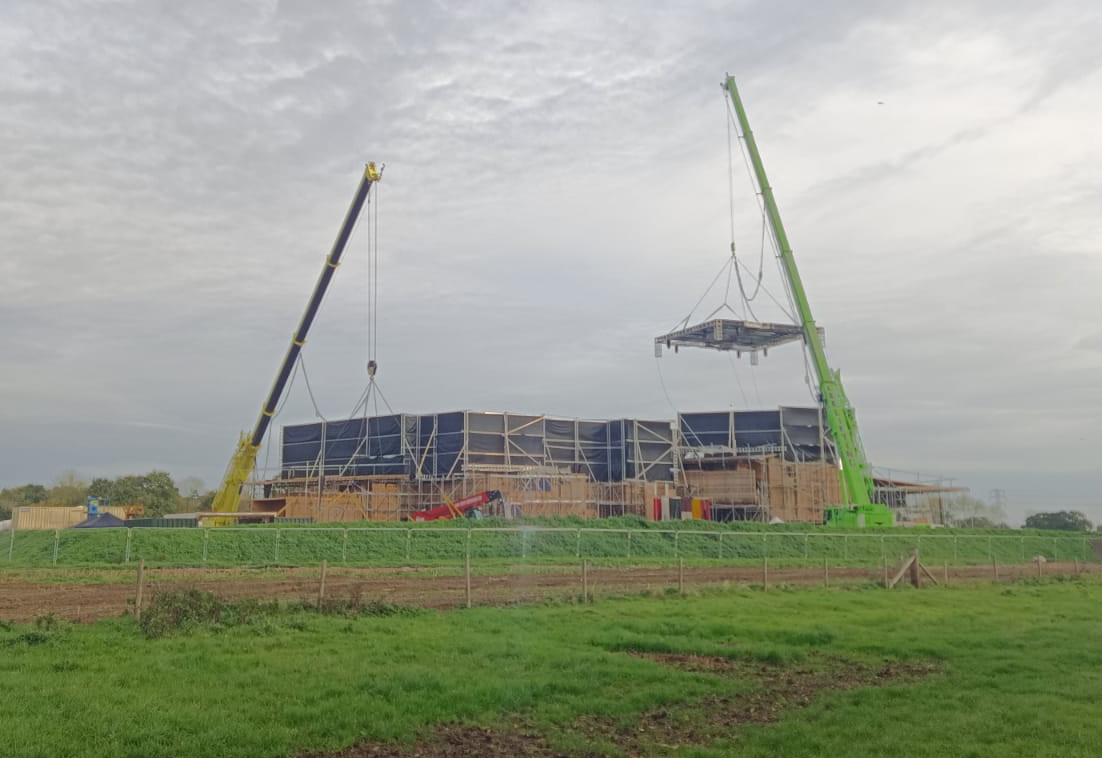
Shinfield Studios Backlot in 2022

Occupying a site of nearly 1,800,000 sq ft, and costing approximately £250 million, Shinfield Studios showcases 18 climate-controlled soundproofed soundstages covering a total area of 433,649 sq ft. Additionally, there is a large circa 9 acre large backlot for filming, as well as workshops and an office environment spanning 130,000 sq ft. With two of the biggest soundstages in the UK at 41,000 sq ft each with a height of 35 metres. On site, there are 38 workshops which can accommodate many different trades including set production, SFX and action vehicles.

== Productions ==
=== Film ===
- Ghostbusters: Frozen Empire (2024)
- Greenland 2: Migration (2026)
- The Magic Faraway Tree (2026)
- Ebenezer (2026)
- Avengers: Doomsday (2026)
- Sonic the Hedgehog 4 (2027)

=== Television series ===
- Queen Charlotte: A Bridgerton Story (2023)
- The Acolyte (2024)
- You Bet! (2024)
- LOL: Last One Laughing UK (2025–2026)
- 99 to Beat (2025)
- Squid Game: The Challenge (2025)
- The Agency (2026)
- Neuromancer (2027)
- Tomb Raider (TBA)
