= Hundred of Charlton =

Coordinates: 51.396°N 0.927°W

Charlton was a hundred in the English county of Berkshire. Like all hundreds, although never abolished, it effectively ceased to function after 1886.

Charlton was one of the seven hundreds of Windsor Forest. It consists of the parishes of Barkham, Finchampstead, Hurst (including Twyford), Shinfield and Swallowfield. Before the early 13th century, it also included what became the parishes of Arborfield, Crowthorne, Earley, Ruscombe, Sandhurst, Sonning, Wokingham and Woodley.
