= Joonas Suotamo =

Finnish basketball player and actor (born 1986)

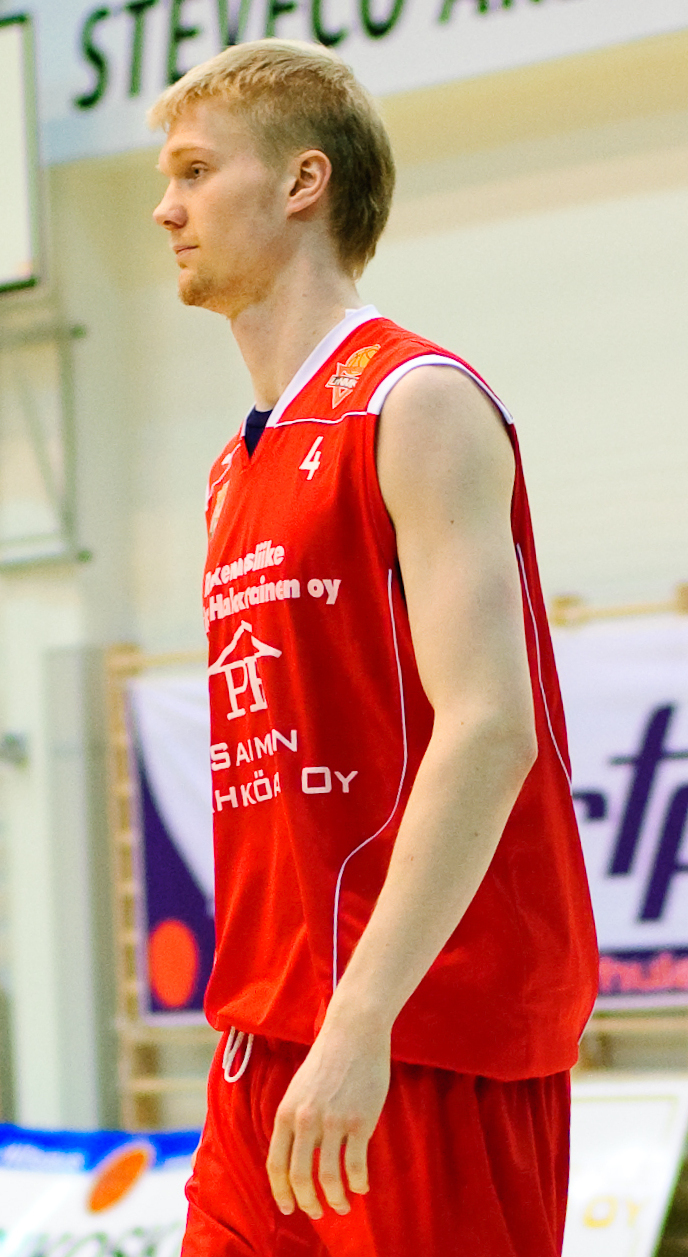
- Suotamo with Lappeenrannan NMKY in 2010
- Born: Joonas Viljami Suotamo; 3 October 1986 (age 40); Espoo, Finland
- Education: Pennsylvania State University (B.A., 2008)
- Known for: Playing Chewbacca in Star Wars
- Basketball career

Personal information
- Listed height: 6 ft 11 in (211 cm)
- Listed weight: 231 lb (105 kg)

Career information
- College: Penn State (2005–2008)
- Playing career: 2004–2015
- Position: Center

Career history
- 2004–2005: Honka
- 2008–2010: LrNMKY
- 2010–2011: Honka
- 2012–2015: EBT
- Website: joonassuotamo.com

Joonas Viljami Suotamo (Finnish pronunciation: [ˈjoːnɑs ˈsuo̯tɑmo]; born 3 October 1986) is a Finnish actor and former professional basketball player. He is best known for his role as Chewbacca in the Star Wars saga, taking over the role from Peter Mayhew, first as a body double, with Star Wars: The Force Awakens (2015), and later as the principal performer of Chewbacca in Star Wars: The Last Jedi (2017), Solo: A Star Wars Story (2018) and in Star Wars: The Rise of Skywalker (2019). He also plays Lurch in the second season of Wednesday on Netflix.

== Early life and education ==
Suotamo was born in Espoo. In his youth he performed roles as a stage actor. Suotamo attended Pennsylvania State University (PSU) and played the power forward and centre positions for the Penn State Nittany Lions. With childhood interests in music, arts, and movies he studied film and video at PSU. He was a strong academic performer at Penn State, where he was twice named to the Academic All-Big Ten team, and graduated in 3 1/2 years with a Bachelor of Arts degree in December 2008 in order to fulfill his Finnish conscription service and to pursue a career in film.

He left the army at the rank of second lieutenant (res).

== Basketball career ==
=== Club career ===
Suotamo played seven seasons in Finland's basketball leagues, including four seasons in the top-tier Korisliiga. He has also had a career selling insurance.

=== National team career ===
Suotamo played three games for the Finnish national basketball team and 66 games for the junior national teams.

== Acting career ==
Suotamo is mostly known for his role as Chewbacca in the Star Wars franchise, a role in which he started out being a body double for the original actor Peter Mayhew in Star Wars: The Force Awakens (2015), as Mayhew's age and worsening health was making it more difficult for him to fill the role. He went on to replace Mayhew entirely in Star Wars: The Last Jedi (2017) as Chewbacca, with Mayhew as a consultant. He returned to the role in Solo: A Star Wars Story (2018) and Star Wars: The Rise of Skywalker (2019). Suotamo made his first non-Chewbacca appearance in the franchise by playing Kelnacca, a Wookiee Jedi in the High Republic era, in The Acolyte.

== Filmography ==
=== Film ===
Year	Title	Role	Notes
2015	Star Wars: The Force Awakens	Chewbacca	Shared role with Peter Mayhew and Ian Whyte
2017	Star Wars: The Last Jedi	Chewbacca	
2018	Solo: A Star Wars Story	Chewbacca	
2019	Star Wars: The Rise of Skywalker	Chewbacca	

=== Television ===
Year(s)	Title	Role	Notes	Network
2022–2023	Willow	The Scourge	4 episodes	Disney+
2024	The Acolyte	Kelnacca	5 episodes	Disney+
2025–present	Wednesday	Lurch	6 episodes	Netflix
