= Shadowbox Studios =

American film and television production studio

Coordinates: 33.6871°N 84.3324°W

Shadowbox Studios is a film and television studio platform offering soundstages, and currently operates an 850,000 square foot studio facility in Atlanta, GA, a 1,000,000 square foot facility in the London metro area, and is actively developing a 650,000 square foot facility in Queensland, Australia.

Shadowbox is owned by affiliates of Commonwealth Asset Management and Silver Lake.

== Locations ==
=== Shadowbox Studios Atlanta ===
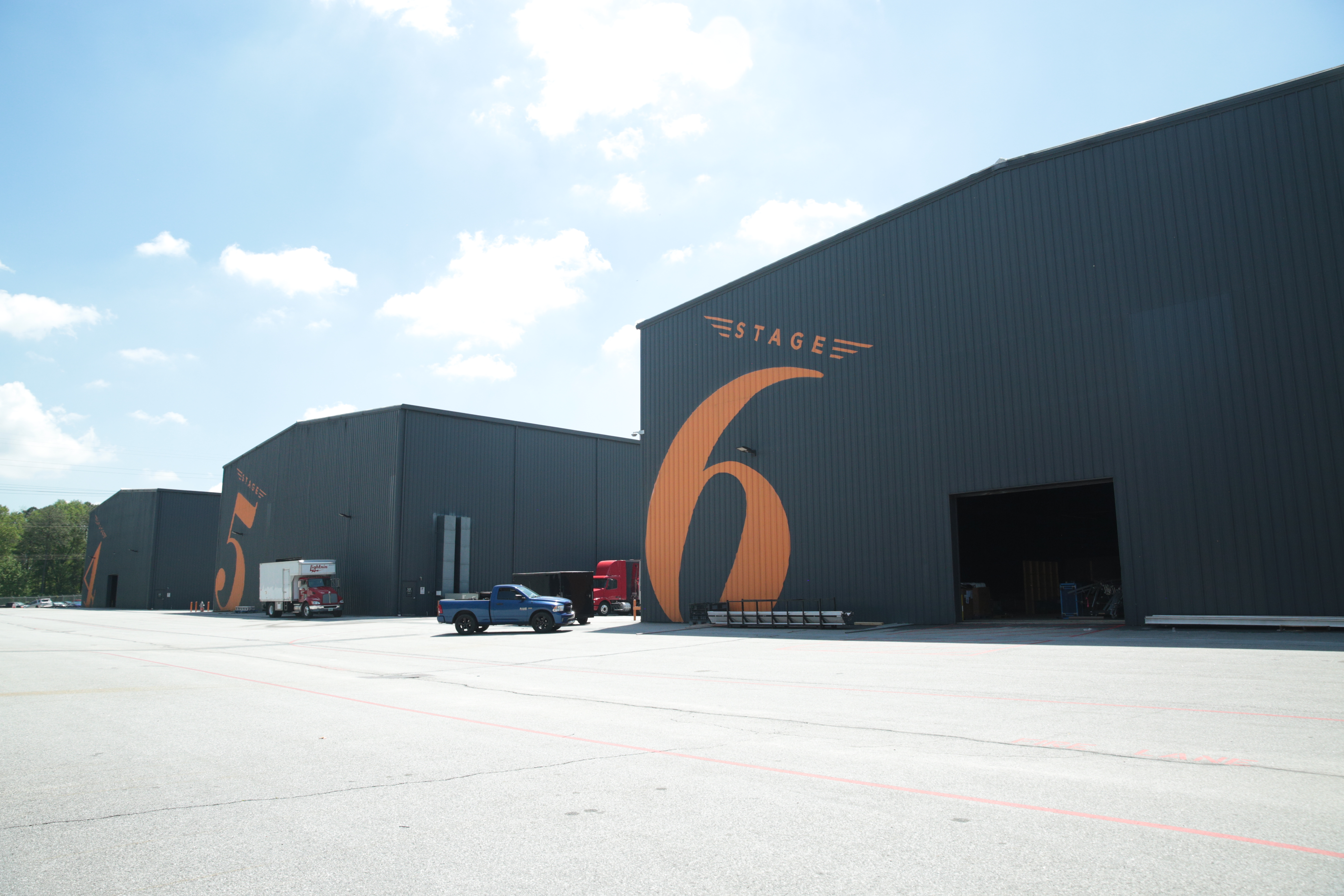
Exterior shot of soundstages at Shadowbox Atlanta.

Shadowbox Studios Atlanta houses 9 purpose-built soundstages ranging in size from 19,200 to 38,400 square feet. Formerly Blackhall Studios, Shadowbox Atlanta opened in 2017 and has been home to major tentpole productions from film and television studios including Warner Bros. and Legendary Entertainment’s Godzilla: King of Monsters and Disney’s Jungle Cruise. In 2022, the studio was rebranded as Shadowbox Studios, after being acquired by Commonwealth Asset Management.

=== Shadowbox Studios Shinfield ===
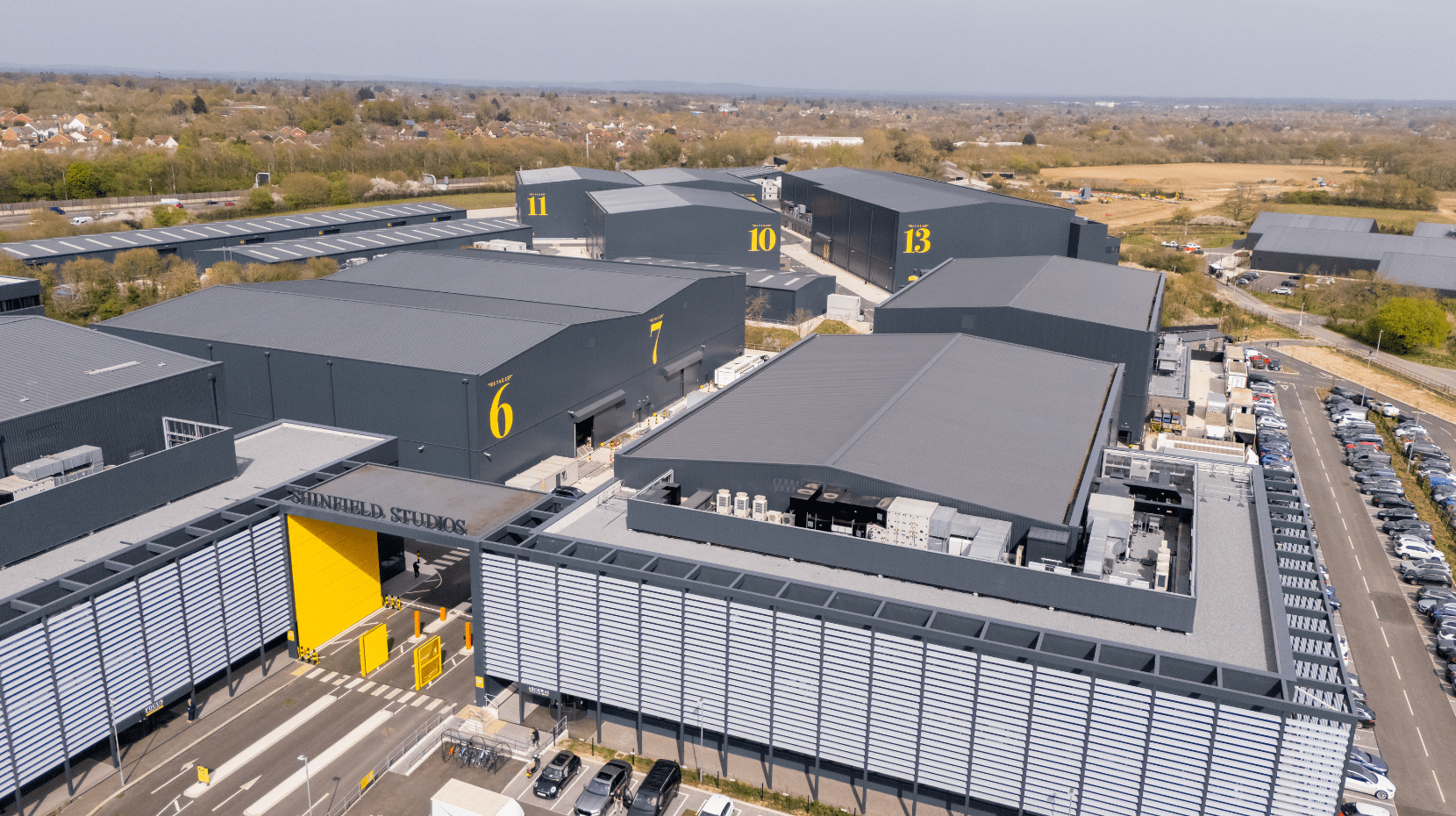
Exterior shot of the Shadowbox Shinfield studio facility

Shadowbox Studios Shinfield is 1 million square feet of stage space and production facilities located just outside of London. The complex comprises 18 soundstages ranging in size from 17,250 to 41,000 square feet. The site has been fully operational since 2024 with Phase 1 opening in 2021. Since then, Shadowbox Shinfield has been home to several productions from major studios and streamers including Netflix, Lucasfilm, and Disney.

=== Shadowbox Studios Kaufman Astoria ===
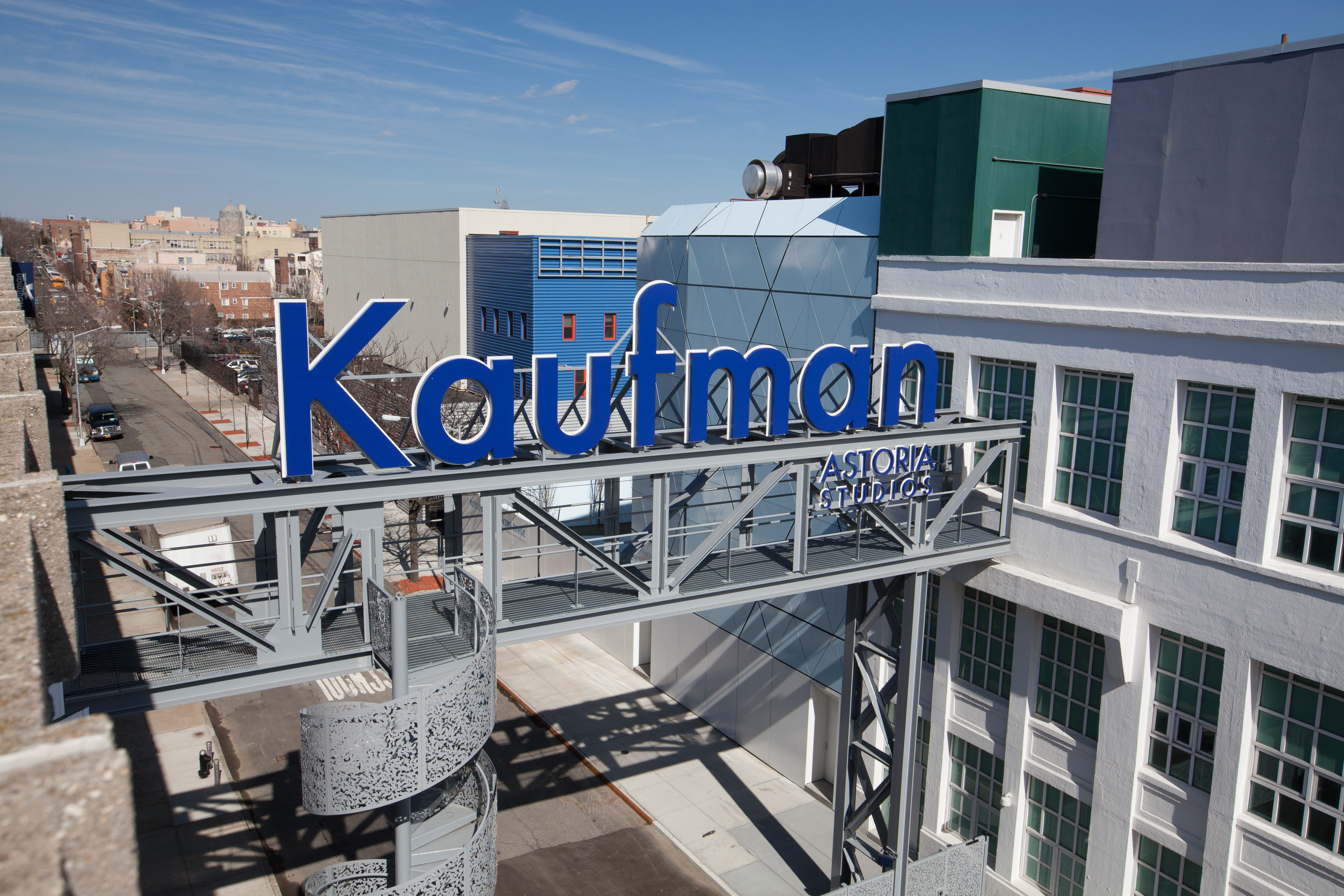
Main entrance of Kaufman Astoria Studios

Shadowbox Studios operates the historic Kaufman Astoria Studios in New York City. Kaufman Astoria Studios boasts 9 premium soundstages across a 500,000 square foot campus, alongside 325,000 square feet of office and support space. Originally opened in 1920 as the home of Paramount Pictures, Kaufman Astoria Studios has housed many major productions from Sesame Street to Succession and The Devil Wears Prada 2.

=== Shadowbox Studios Gold Coast ===
Shadowbox Studios Gold Coast will be a screen production facility in Yatala, Gold Coast, Australia. Construction is set to commence in 2026 for a planned 2028 opening.

== Workforce education ==
Shadowbox Studios’ runs an in-house workforce development program called Shadowbox Backlot Academy.

== Production partners ==
Past production partners of Shadowbox Studios include Netflix, Apple, Disney, Amazon, Warner Bros, Paramount, Legendary, Marvel, Lucasfilm, and more. Select productions include: The Acolyte, Ghostbusters: Frozen Empire, Squid Game: The Challenge (Season 2), Godzilla: King of Monsters, and Jungle Cruise.
