= Cattle Breeding Centre =

- Location within Berkshire
- Former names: Reading Centre for the Artificial Insemination of Cattle, AI Centre

General information
- Type: Animal Research Centre
- Location: Church Lane, RG2 9BZ
- Coordinates: 51.413°N 0.9459°W
- Elevation: 25 m (82 ft)
- Current tenants: Housing estate
- Completed: February 1943
- Demolished: 1991
- Owner: University of Reading

The Cattle Breeding Centre was a veterinary research centre at Shinfield in the United Kingdom.

== History ==
The site opened in February 1943 as the Reading Centre for the Artificial Insemination of Dairy Cattle. It had Shorthorn and Guernsey cattle. In January 1944 the site produced the world's first calf produced by artificial insemination, working with the Agricultural Improvement Council. Another site had been opened at Cambridge in November 1942.

The site closed in 1991.

=== Visits ===
On Thursday 15 November 1979, the site was visited by President General Suharto of Indonesia; the President had come to power in a coup in 1965, and the visit was attended by protestors from Reading University Amnesty International group. On Wednesday 29 October 1980, the site was visited by the second President of Botswana, Quett Masire.

=== Demolition ===
The site was demolished by the University of Reading and sold for housing (360 houses) in 2003.

== Structure ==
The site was east of the A327, south of the M4, around a half-mile east of the former headquarters of Berkshire County Council. A short section of the National Cycle Network 50 runs east–west past the former site.

== Function ==
The site worked with artificial insemination (AI) of cattle and pigs.

== See also ==
- Former Meat Research Institute in North Somerset
