= Shinfield =

Village and civil parish in Berkshire, England

Coordinates: 51.408°N 0.947°W

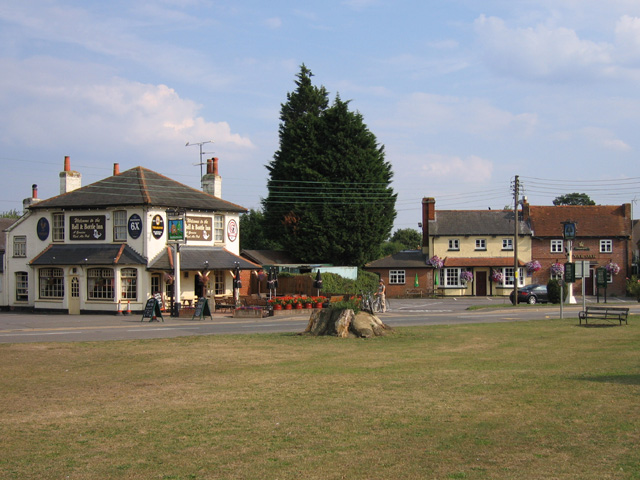
- The Bell and Bottle and The Royal Oak facing the village green

- Location within Berkshire
- Population: 8,136 (2001); 11,277 (2011 Census)
- OS grid reference: SU7368
- Civil parish: Shinfield
- Unitary authority: Wokingham
- Ceremonial county: Berkshire
- Region: South East
- Country: England
- Sovereign state: United Kingdom
- Post town: Reading
- Postcode district: RG2, RG7
- Dialling code: 0118
- Police: Thames Valley
- Fire: Royal Berkshire
- Ambulance: South Central
- UK Parliament: Earley and Woodley

Shinfield is a village and civil parish in the Borough of Wokingham, Berkshire, England. It lies just south of Reading, around 3 miles (4.8 km) from the town centre, and covers an area of 4,313 acres (17.45 km^{2}). Shinfield Park is the northern part of the parish, becoming physically separated from Reading when the M4 motorway was constructed in 1971.

== Geography ==
The parish includes the roadside hamlets of Ryeish Green, Spencers Wood, Three Mile Cross, Shinfield Village and Grazeley and the southern portion of the suburb of Reading called Shinfield Rise. It is surrounded on its eastern and southern boundary by the River Loddon. The M4 motorway runs west–east through the northern portion of the parish, near the former Berkshire County Council's Shire Hall, now the offices of the John Wood Group; the part to the north of the M4 corresponds closely with the part known as Shinfield Park.

The main road through the village, running north–south, is the former A327, running between Reading and Aldershot, with the A327 now bypassing the village centre. Shinfield Village is centred on the village green (School Green), surrounded by a pub, a shop, the village school and recreation grounds. Its residential housing has increased considerably during the first years of the 21st century. The parish consists of a central ridge of high land sloping down to the river Loddon on the east and the Kennet Valley on the west. The soil is mostly London Clay, with patchy spreads of valley and plateau gravel.

== Government ==
As well as being part of the District of Wokingham, Shinfield is governed by a parish council consisting of fifteen parish councillors, assisted by two full-time administrative staff and several part-time caretaking and maintenance employees. Shinfield has been part of the Hundred of Charlton since before the Norman Conquest. Hundreds effectively ceased to function after 1886. Between 1894 and 1974, it was in the Wokingham Rural District. There are many manors and supposed manors in the parish: Shinfield, Hartley Dummer alias Arbor, Hartley Battle, Hartley Amys, Hartley Pellitot, Moor Place, Diddenham Court, Hartley Court and Garston. Hartley Dummer is in the hundred of Theale. The Diddenham estate was officially a detached part of Wiltshire until transferred to Berkshire in 1844.

== History ==
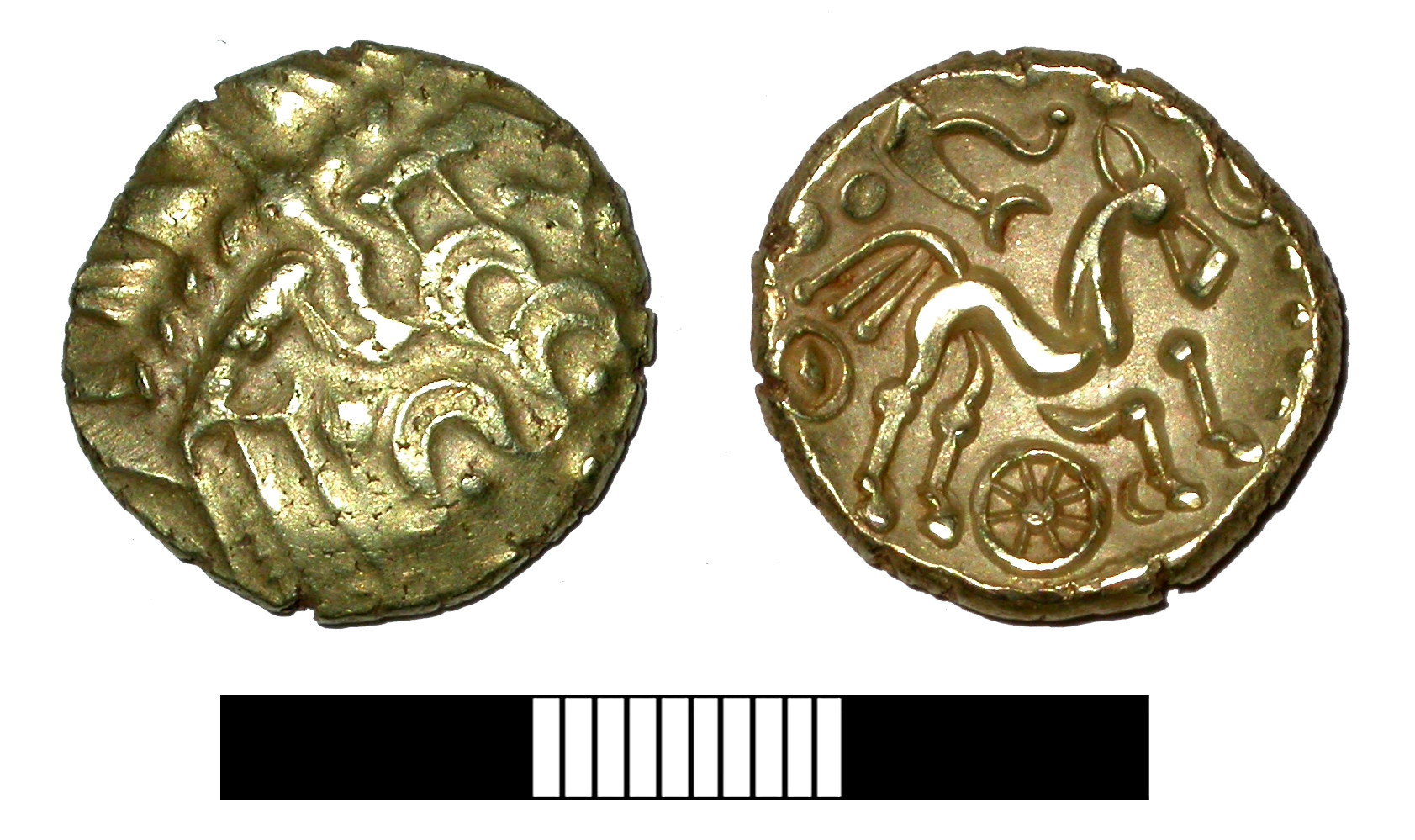
An Iron Age gold stater coin, found in Shinfield and dated to c. 60 – c. 50 BCE

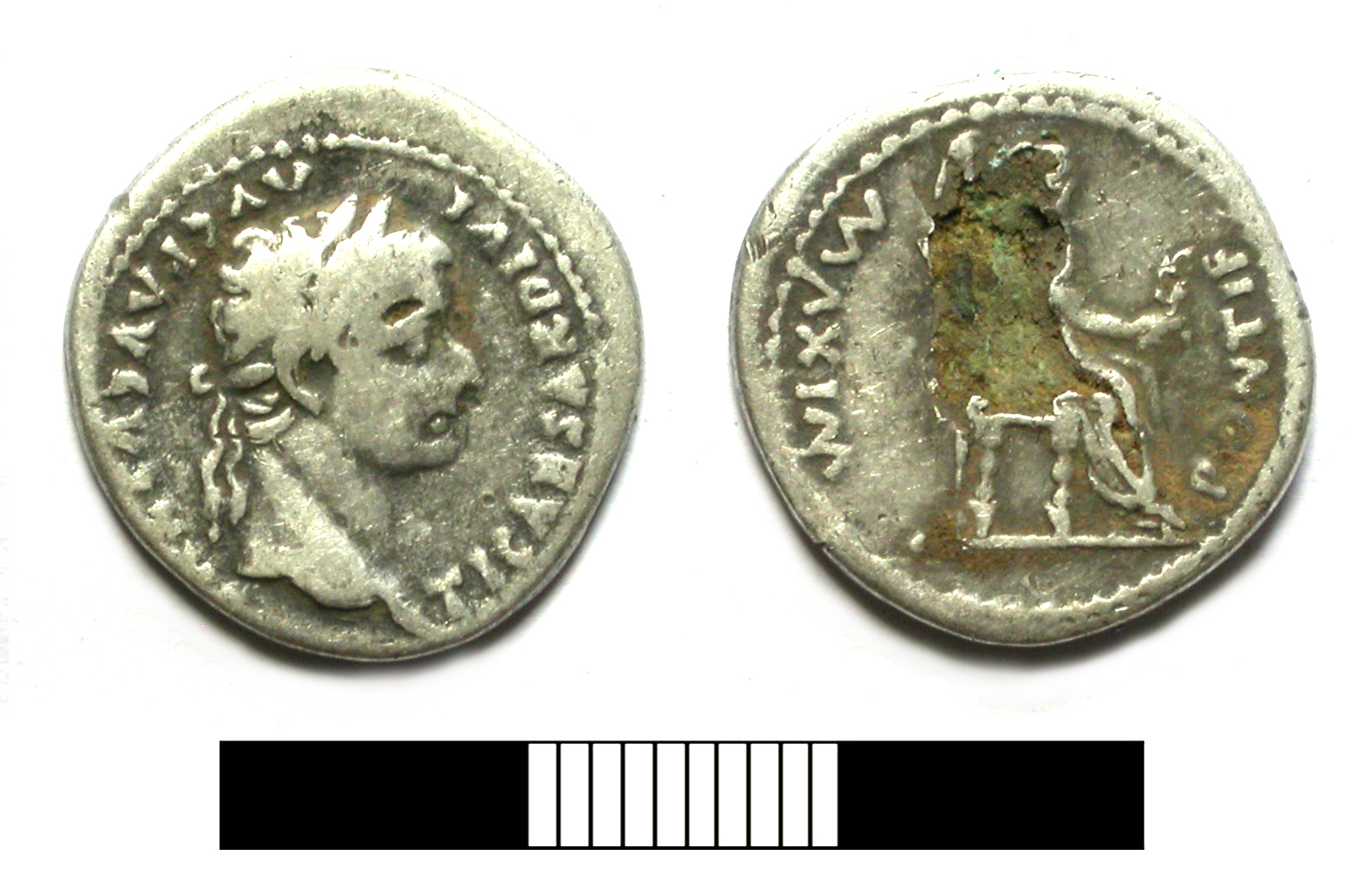
A silver-plated denarius of Tiberius, found in Shinfield in 2012 and dated to c. 16 – c. 37 CE

The village was named Shining Field, by the Anglo-Saxons, after the sparkling flood-waters which still often cover the meadows down by the Loddon on the Arborfield border. The manor was one of the many owned by Catherine of Aragon in Tudor times. She is said to have stayed there on occasion, possibly while visiting Reading Abbey. During the Civil War, Charles I is said to have stayed at Goodrest House (now part of Crosfields School). Later, the local church tower was blown to pieces by Parliamentary soldiers trying to oust a group of Royalists who were hiding there. The brick replacement can still be seen today. The church is the last resting place of the parents of author Mary Russell Mitford.

RAF Shinfield Park was located in the north of the Parish and was the home of RAF Flying Training Command from 1940 until 1968. It then became the home of the Meteorological Office College from 1971 until 2002. The European Centre for Medium-Range Weather Forecasts (ECMWF) remains on the site though the rest has been converted to residential housing. The Cattle Breeding Centre operated at Shinfield from 1943 to 1991.

The Thames Valley Science Park opened in 2018. Shinfield Studios, a film and television studio complex opened on the site in 2024.

== Transport ==
The Shinfield Eastern Relief Road opened on 31 October 2017. It serves the Shinfield Campus of the University of Reading's Thames Valley Science Park.

Shinfield is served by Reading Buses, routes 3 and 600.

== Institutions ==
The Church of England parish church of St. Mary is a Grade I listed building, dating from the 12th century, but rebuilt in the fourteenth, and restored in 1857 by Sir George Gilbert Scott. Shinfield Baptist Church started in 1908, but was renamed in 2022 as the Shinfield Community Church.

There are several nursery, infant and junior schools in the parish.

== Notable residents ==
- Shinfield is the current home of Glenn Little (Wrexham FC), James Harper (Reading FC/Arsenal), Jem Karacan (Reading FC) and Brynjar Gunnarsson (Reading FC).
- Lenny Henry and Dawn French once had a home in Spencers Wood.
