= Thames Valley Science Park =

British business park

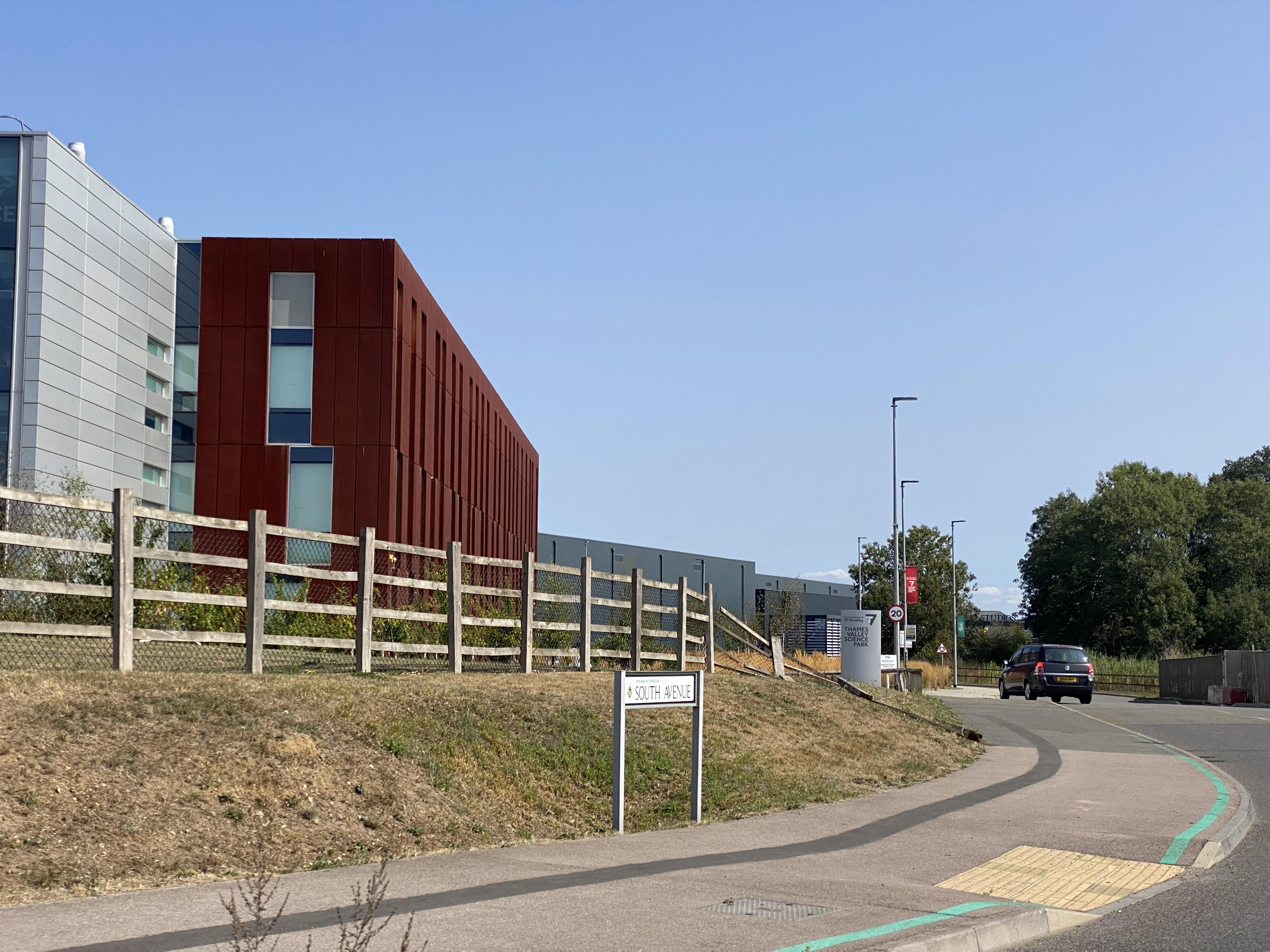
- Thames Valley Science Park entrance

- Location within Reading
- Location: Shinfield, Berkshire, England
- Coordinates: 51.4149°N 0.9403°W
- Owner: University of Reading

The Thames Valley Science Park (also known as TVSP) is a business park located in Shinfield, near Reading, Berkshire, England. It is wholly owned and managed by the University of Reading, serving as a hub for innovation, research, and collaboration between academia and business.

== History ==
The Thames Valley Science Park was developed by the University of Reading as part of its strategy to boost the local and regional economy by leveraging its academic expertise and research facilities. Plans for the park went on display in summer 2016, outlining the transformation of 42 acres (17 ha) of greenfield land into a business park with expected expansions over the next 15 to 20 years.

The first major structure, the Gateway Building, opened in 2018, marking the start of a phased, long-term development. The Gateway Building provides 70,000 square feet (6,500 m^{2}) of office and laboratory space, initially accommodating approximately 20 technology-led companies, ranging from start-ups to established R&D centres. This building also houses the Innovation Catalyst, a hub to support entrepreneurs and growing businesses.

Outline planning consent for the second phase, comprising conceptual plans for up to 15 further buildings, was granted in 2017. The full Science Park is planned to be developed over an extended period, potentially taking up to 20 years to fully complete, with the potential to create up to 5,000 new jobs.

A biodiversity plan costing £1m began in October 2025 to relandscape and improve the areas ecological value.

=== Link with the University of Reading ===
The Thames Valley Science Park maintains a connection with the University of Reading, offering businesses on the park several advantages. This partnership provides access to graduate recruitment and student project engagement opportunities. Companies can also leverage the university's expertise for research collaborations and specialised knowledge. Furthermore, businesses can utilise specialist university equipment and facilities, as well as dedicated business support programmes and events, including initiatives like the Henley Accelerator from the university's Henley Business School.

== Tennants ==
The Thames Valley Science Park has attracted a mix of companies and institutions, focusing on sectors beyond traditional science and technology to include cultural heritage and creative industries. The park is home to around 80 organisations.

Notable developments and tenants include:

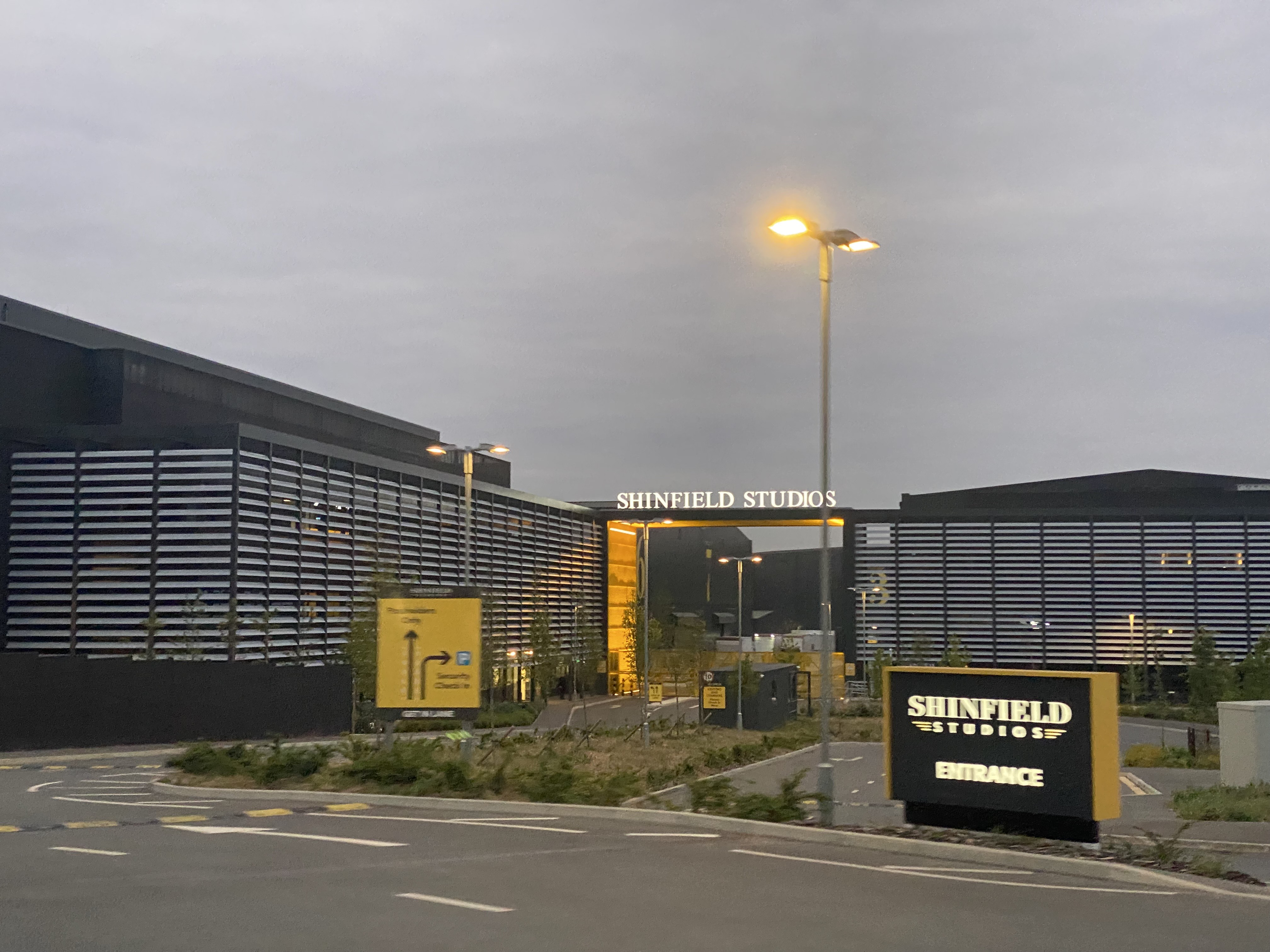
Shinfield Studios entrance

- Shinfield Studios: The Science Park is the location for the university's development of Cine Valley, a major film, TV, and digital media hub. Shinfield Studios, a key tenant, provides purpose-built sound stages, workshops, and offices, which have already begun hosting major film productions.
- Natural History Museum: The NHM is constructing a new Collections, Science and Digitisation Centre at the Science Park. This major facility is planned to house approximately 28 million specimens from the museum's collection, along with innovative digital, analytical, and genomic technologies, supporting global research into urgent environmental issues. The facility is expected to open fully by 2031.
- British Museum: The Archaeological Research Collection (ARC), a purpose-built facility, houses approximately 1.3 million objects from the British Museum's collection. It is a destination for researchers and facilitates outreach activities, including sharing collections with the University of Reading. New plans have been approved for a new entrance to the site.

Additionally, there have been numerous mid-sized companies operating across sectors such as digital media, quantum computing, medical diagnostics, biotechnology, and other R&D fields. Early tenants included companies like BioInteractions Limited and Clasado BioSciences.

== Location and transport ==
The Thames Valley Science Park is located in Shinfield, just to the south of Reading and immediately adjacent to the M4 motorway (Junction 11). Its proximity to the M4 provides excellent connections to London, Bristol, and the wider UK motorway network. Reading Buses' Leopard 3 connects the park to Wokingham and the Reading railway station, a major transport hub with frequent services to London Paddington and Heathrow Airport.
