= Star Wars: The Acolyte =

American television series

The Acolyte
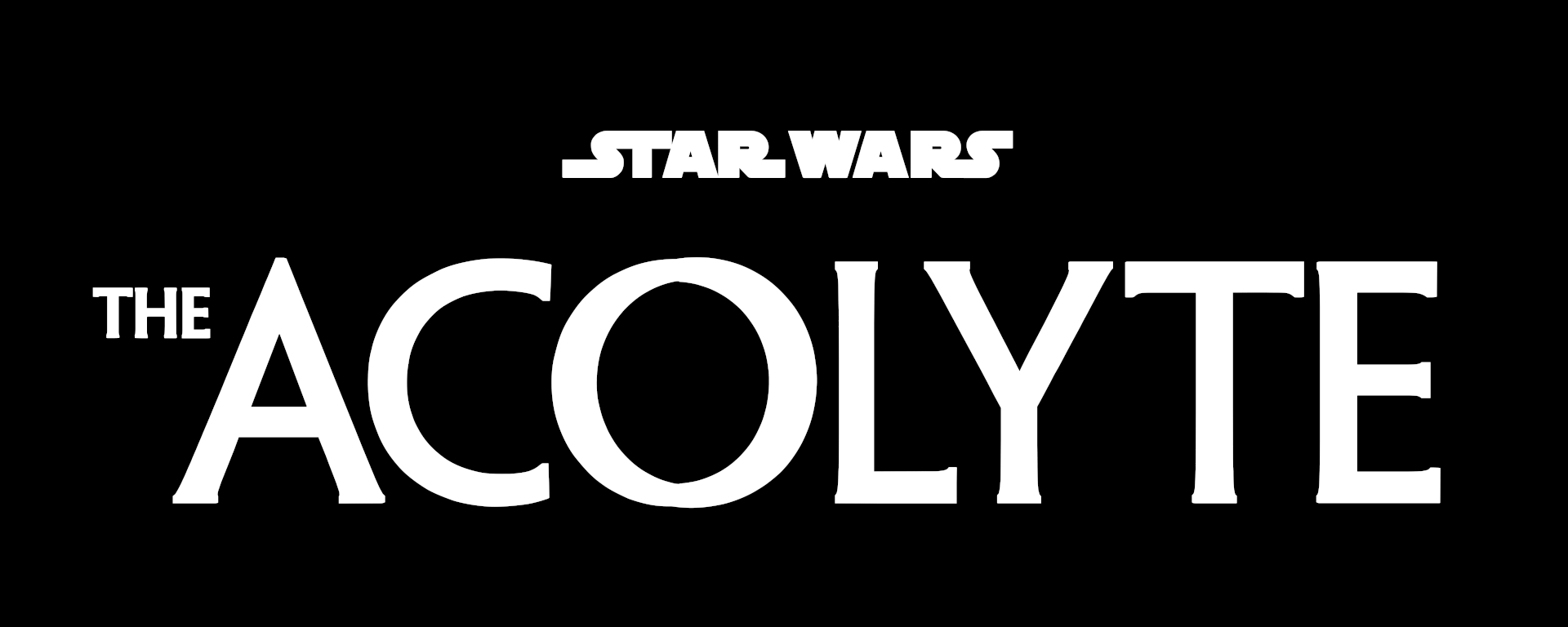
- Also known as: Star Wars: The Acolyte
- Genre: Action-adventure; Mystery-thriller; Science fiction
- Created by: Leslye Headland
- Based on: Star Wars by George Lucas
- Showrunner: Leslye Headland
- Starring: Amandla Stenberg; Lee Jung-jae; Charlie Barnett; Dafne Keen; Rebecca Henderson; Jodie Turner-Smith; Carrie-Anne Moss; Manny Jacinto; Dean-Charles Chapman; Joonas Suotamo; Margarita Levieva; Lauren Brady; Leah Brady; Harry Trevaldwyn; David Harewood
- Composer: Michael Abels
- Country of origin: United States
- Original language: English
- No. of seasons: 1
- No. of episodes: 8

Production
- Executive producers: Leslye Headland; Kathleen Kennedy; Simon Emanuel; Jason Micallef; Jeff F. King
- Producers: Rayne Roberts; Damian Anderson; Rob Bredow; Eileen Shim
- Production location: United Kingdom
- Cinematography: Chris Teague; James Friend
- Editors: Miikka Leskinen; Cheryl Potter
- Running time: 35–43 minutes
- Production companies: Lucasfilm; Shoot to Midnight
- Budget: $230.8 million (gross); $187 million (net)

Original release
- Network: Disney+
- Release: June 4 – July 16, 2024

Related
- Star Wars: The High Republic

The Acolyte, also known as Star Wars: The Acolyte, is an American science fiction television series created by Leslye Headland for the streaming service Disney+. It is part of the Star Wars franchise, set at the end of the High Republic era before the events of the Skywalker Saga, and follows a Jedi investigation into a series of crimes.

Amandla Stenberg, Lee Jung-jae, Charlie Barnett, Dafne Keen, Rebecca Henderson, Jodie Turner-Smith, Carrie-Anne Moss, Manny Jacinto, Dean-Charles Chapman, Joonas Suotamo, Margarita Levieva, Lauren Brady, Leah Brady, Harry Trevaldwyn, and David Harewood star in the series. Headland expressed interest in working on the Star Wars franchise by the end of 2019, and was developing a new series for Lucasfilm by April 2020. She wanted to explore the franchise from the perspective of the villains. The title was announced in December 2020. Filming took place at Shinfield Studios in Berkshire from October 2022 to June 2023, with location filming in Wales and Portugal.

The Acolyte premiered on Disney+ with its first two episodes on June 4, 2024. The other six episodes were released weekly through July 16. Reviews by critics were generally favorable. The series, which divided fans of the franchise, became the subject of a review bombing campaign and received lower viewership than previous Star Wars series. It was canceled in August 2024 due to low viewership and going over budget. The series received several accolades including a Primetime Creative Arts Emmy Award nomination.

== Premise ==
The Acolyte is set at the end of the Star Wars franchise's High Republic era, approximately 100 years before Star Wars: Episode I – The Phantom Menace (1999). It sees a respected Jedi Master investigating a series of crimes that bring him into contact with a former Padawan learner and reveal sinister forces.

== Cast and characters ==
=== Main ===
- Amandla Stenberg as Verosha "Osha" and Mae-ho "Mae" Aniseya:
  Twin sisters who were separated by a tragedy when they were young. Osha is the former Padawan learner of Sol who left the Jedi Order due to "internal turmoil" she has regarding her connection to the Force. Mae is presumed dead until she re-emerges as a dangerous warrior using the dark side of the Force. Stenberg studied the Star Wars films and the online encyclopedia Wookieepedia in preparation for the series, and she wrote backstories for both her characters. She compared them to the concept of yin and yang: Mae represents the yin, with Stenberg describing her as intuitive and acting based on emotion; Osha represents the yang, with a more "masculine" façade hiding her fragility. Shanice Archer was Stenberg's performance double for scenes in which both Osha and Mae appear, with different techniques used to achieve the final effect.
  - Lauren Brady as young Osha
  - Leah Brady as young Mae
- Lee Jung-jae as Sol:
  A respected Jedi Master. Lee was surprised that creator Leslye Headland wanted him for the character based on his performance in Squid Game as Seong Gi-hun, feeling the two characters were very different. The series is Lee's first English language role, and he worked with two dialect coaches starting four months ahead of filming to be able to perform his lines. He took inspiration from previous Jedi Masters in the franchise, particularly Liam Neeson's performance as Qui-Gon Jinn, and worked with Headland to be specific about the character's emotions in each scene due to Sol having to balance a Jedi's control of emotions with his complicated feelings about Osha and Mae.
- Charlie Barnett as Yord Fandar: A by-the-book Jedi Knight who aids Sol and Jecki
- Dafne Keen as Jecki Lon: Sol's current young Padawan. Jecki is half-human, half-Theelin just like Rystáll Sant, a background character from the 1997 special edition of the film Return of the Jedi (1983).
- Rebecca Henderson as Vernestra Rwoh: A senior member of the Jedi Order who rose to prominence as a young prodigy
- Jodie Turner-Smith as Mother Aniseya: The leader of a coven of Force witches who created Osha and Mae using the Force
- Carrie-Anne Moss as Indara:
  A Jedi Master proficient in "Force-fu" fighting, who is killed by Mae at the start of the series. Headland wanted the audience to immediately feel that Indara was "the most powerful Jedi in the room". She was inspired by Moss's portrayal of Trinity in The Matrix film series when creating the character and intended for audiences to see Indara as "Trinity with a lightsaber". Headland felt the character's death set the tone for the series, established that Jedi can be killed, and indicated that audience assumptions about who is good and bad could be wrong. Moss bonded with Stenberg on set over their shared spiritual background.
- Manny Jacinto as the Stranger:
  Mae's Sith master who initially disguises himself as a smuggler and apothecary named "Qimir". He was inspired by the character Drunken Cat from the film Come Drink with Me (1966). The first-season finale reveals that he was previously the Jedi Padawan of Vernestra. Headland said the character's true name would have been revealed in a potential second season and confirmed that he is now the apprentice of the Sith lord Darth Plagueis. The production referred to the Stranger as "Frank", named after the figure in a "grotesque" rabbit costume from the film Donnie Darko (2001); that costume inspired the "toothy" smile on the Stranger's mask. The mask includes elements from previous Star Wars villains Darth Vader and Darth Maul, and has a similar shape to the helmet of Kylo Ren from the Star Wars sequel trilogy. After noticing this, Headland felt there could be a connection between the two characters and leaned into this with the storytelling, including by using music that evokes Kylo Ren's theme from the films. Since Plagueis goes on to have a different apprentice, Palpatine, in later Star Wars stories, Headland felt it could make sense if the Stranger was eventually revealed to be the first Knight of Ren rather than an actual Sith, potentially with a name that includes "Ren".
- Dean-Charles Chapman as Torbin: A scarred Jedi Master who took the Barash Vow, floating in a silent state of Force meditation for over a decade. This vow was introduced in the Star Wars: Darth Vader comic book (2017).
- Joonas Suotamo as Kelnacca: A Wookiee Jedi who lives a solitary life
- Margarita Levieva as Mother Koril: A Zabrak witch who carried Osha and Mae
- Harry Trevaldwyn as Mog Adana: A Jedi padawan who aids Vernestra
- David Harewood as Rayencourt: A Republic senator who mistrusts the Jedi Order

=== Guest ===
- Thara Schöön as Tasi Lowa: Yord Fandar's Padawan
- Derek Arnold as Ki-Adi-Mundi: a Cerean Jedi Master
- Hassan Taj as Bazil: a Tynnan tracker who helps the Jedi. The Tynnans were introduced in the Star Wars Expanded Universe (EU) novel Han Solo's Revenge (1979).

The season finale features brief cameo appearances from Jedi Master Yoda—portrayed using a puppet—and the Sith lord Darth Plagueis. Plagueis was first referenced in Star Wars: Episode III – Revenge of the Sith (2005) and further explored in EU works, but this series is the character's first on-screen appearance. The character is depicted to be a Muun, the species that he was established as in the EU.

== Episodes ==
No.	Title	Directed by	Written by	Original release date
1	"Lost / Found"	Leslye Headland	Leslye Headland	June 4, 2024
100 years before the rise of the Galactic Empire, the Galactic Republic and Jedi Order preside during a time of centuries-long peace. In a bar on the planet Ueda, Jedi Master Indara is attacked and killed by a woman wielding daggers. The bartender identifies Osha Aniseya, a former Jedi Padawan learner, as the killer. Osha, who works as a meknek doing dangerous repairs on the outside of starships, denies committing the crime when arrested by Jedi Knight Yord Fandar and his Padawan Tasi Lowa. En route to Coruscant, the galactic capital, Osha's fellow prisoners escape and leave her to crash-land on the planet Carlac. She sees a vision of her twin sister Mae, who was presumed dead in a fire that seemingly killed their family when they were young. Osha deduces that Mae is alive and the one who killed Indara. Jedi Master Vernestra Rwoh sends Master Sol, Osha's former teacher, to Carlac with his current Padawan, Jecki Lon, and Yord. They find Osha, and Sol accepts her theory about Mae. Mae meets with her mysterious master, who has challenged her to kill a Jedi without using a weapon.
2	"Revenge / Justice"	Leslye Headland	Jason Micallef and Charmaine DeGraté	June 4, 2024
Mae attempts to kill Jedi Master Torbin in a temple on the planet Olega, but is prevented by his Force meditation; Torbin has been floating in silent meditation for over a decade. Vernestra sends Sol, Jecki, Yord, and Osha to investigate the attack. Mae regroups with her supplier, Qimir, who is helping her hunt the four Jedi that were stationed on her and Osha's home planet, Brendok, at the time of the fire: Indara, Torbin, Sol, and the Wookiee Kelnacca. Qimir provides Mae with a poison and warns her that she still needs to kill one of the four without a weapon. Mae offers the poison to Torbin as absolution for his past. He stops meditating and willingly takes it, dying just as the others arrive. Mae escapes, and Osha poses as her to get information from Qimir. He reveals the existence of Mae's master and her plan. That night, Sol confronts Mae and reveals to her that Osha is alive. Osha attempts to stun Mae but misses, and Mae escapes again. She later threatens Qimir over talking to the Jedi, but he convinces her to spare him because he has learned that Kelnacca is living on the planet Khofar.
3	"Destiny"	Kogonada	Jasmyne Flournoy and Eileen Shim	June 11, 2024
16 years earlier, Osha and Mae live with a coven of witches on Brendok. Their mother and coven leader, Mother Aniseya, claims the twins do not have a father. They were carried by another witch, Mother Koril. Aniseya teaches the children that the Force, which she calls the Thread, is misused by the Jedi. They undergo a ceremony to be inducted into the coven, which Mae is excited about but Osha is not. Before Osha is inducted, the ceremony is interrupted by the four Jedi who express concern that the witches are training children. They claim the right to test the twins for their suitability to become Jedi. Aniseya asks the children to fail the test. Mae does, but Osha passes and tells Aniseya that she wishes to become a Jedi. Angry that her sister wants to leave her, Mae locks Osha in her room and burns her diary. The fire spreads and Sol saves Osha, but Mae seemingly dies. Sol and Osha find the rest of the coven dead. The Jedi take Osha to Coruscant and Sol promises to train her as his Padawan. On Brendok, Mae is shown to have survived and started looking for Osha.
4	"Day"	Alex García López	Claire Kiechel and Kor Adana	June 18, 2024
Mae and Qimir begin searching for Kelnacca on Khofar, where he has isolated himself in a forest. Sol discusses Mae with several Jedi Masters who believe her master must be a fallen Jedi. They send him and Osha to apprehend Mae with a group of Jedi, including Yord and Jecki. On Khofar, they use the Tynnan tracker Bazil to begin searching for Kelnacca by following his scent. Osha's connection to the Force begins to grow again and she connects with an umbramoth, a large bug, which attacks them and is killed by Sol. Mae begins to feel that her mission to kill a Jedi without a weapon is impossible and no longer relevant to her now that she knows Osha is alive. She captures Qimir in a trap and rushes to turn herself in to Kelnacca, planning to reconnect with Osha and tell the Jedi what she knows about her master. However, she finds Kelnacca has been killed by someone using a lightsaber. The others soon arrive and surround Mae, ordering her to surrender. Mae's master appears behind them wearing a helmet. He activates a red lightsaber and uses the Force to attack Osha and the Jedi.
5	"Night"	Alex García López	Kor Adana and Cameron Squires	June 25, 2024
Mae's master kills all the Jedi except Yord, Jecki, and Sol. Sol saves Osha and demands the master reveal his identity. He claims that they have already met and then vanishes into the forest. Jecki captures Mae, but her master arrives to kill Mae for trying to betray him. Jecki breaks the master's brittle helmet before being killed, revealing him to be Qimir. Sol questions Qimir, who says that he has no name, the Jedi might call him "Sith", and he plans to kill them all to keep his existence secret. Yord ambushes Qimir, disarming him, but is quickly killed. Enraged, Sol overpowers Qimir but is stopped from killing him by Osha, who plants a light on Qimir that causes a colony of umbramoths to attack and carry him away. Mae uses Osha's stun gun on Sol so she can speak with Osha, but they end up arguing about each other's choices and Mae uses the Force to knock Osha unconscious. Mae steals Osha's clothes, cuts her hair, and poses as her sister, returning with Sol to the Jedi ship. They are followed by a suspicious Bazil. Qimir frees himself from the umbramoths and finds Osha unconscious in the forest.
6	"Teach / Corrupt"	Hanelle Culpepper	Leslye Headland and Jocelyn Bioh	July 2, 2024
Qimir takes Osha to an unknown planet where he dresses her wounds. He claims to be a former Jedi who was betrayed by his master, drawing parallels to Osha's past. She is wary, but agrees to try on his repaired helmet, which is made from the lightsaber-disabling metal cortosis. On the Jedi ship at Khofar, interference disrupts Sol's attempts to contact the Jedi Council; a partial message about losing his whole team makes it to Coruscant. Sol asks Mae to help fix the ship's power, still believing her to be Osha, and she is attacked by Bazil. Mae overpowers him and resets the power. She tries to get Sol to tell her the truth about what happened on Brendok, but her wording reveals to him that she is not Osha. When the ship's power is restored, Sol stuns Mae and leaves with her just as Vernestra and a small band of Jedi arrive to investigate his message. They find the massacre and suspect a fallen Jedi is responsible. The Jedi Mog suggests that only Sol would be powerful enough to kill so many. When Mae wakes, Sol says he will tell her the truth about what happened on Brendok.
7	"Choice"	Kogonada	Charmaine DeGraté and Jen Richards & Jasmyne Flournoy	July 9, 2024
16 years earlier, the four Jedi discover the coven while investigating a potential "vergence" in the Force on Brendok, which could create life. The council says the twins are too old and should be left with the coven, despite Osha's wish to become a Jedi; Koril stokes Mae's anger over Osha's decision, leading to Mae accidentally starting the fire. The results for the twins' "M-count", which shows their Force sensitivity, indicates that they were artificially created with a single consciousness split into two bodies. Torbin, eager to return to Coruscant, sees this as proof of the vergence and rushes to retrieve the girls. Sol follows and the pair confront the coven before Kelnacca and Indara arrive. Sol impulsively kills Aniseya when she attempts to use her power and Koril vanishes. The witches possess Kelnacca and use him to attack Torbin and Sol until Indara overpowers and kills them. Sol is unable to save both Mae and Osha from the collapsing fortress and chooses to save Osha. Indara decides to blame the incident on Mae's fire and not tell the council about Sol's actions so he can train Osha as his Padawan.
8	"The Acolyte"	Hanelle Culpepper	Jason Micallef	July 16, 2024
Sol takes Mae to Brendok and sends their location to the Jedi. Osha has a vision seemingly of Mae killing Sol and agrees to lead Qimir to her; a mysterious figure watches the pair depart. (Note: Identified off-screen as the Sith lord Darth Plagueis) In the ruins of the witches' fortress, Osha confronts Mae as Sol duels Qimir. Mae disarms Sol after he defeats Qimir, but chooses to let him live so he can confess his crimes to the council. Sol reveals that Mae and Osha are the same person, created through the vergence on Brendok, and admits to killing Aniseya. Osha angrily kills Sol using the Force, corrupting the kyber crystal in his lightsaber which turns from blue to red. She and Mae escape before Vernestra arrives with a group of Jedi and finds Sol's body. The sisters reconcile and Osha agrees to train with Qimir. He uses the Force to wipe Mae's memory. On Coruscant, the Senate launches an investigation into the Jedi Order. Vernestra blames the murders of Indara, Torbin, Kelnacca, Jecki, Yord, and the witches on Sol, despite sensing Qimir's involvement. Qimir was once her apprentice, and she wants Mae's help to find him. Vernestra reports to a Jedi Master. (Note: Identified off-screen as Jedi Master Yoda)

== Production ==
=== Development ===
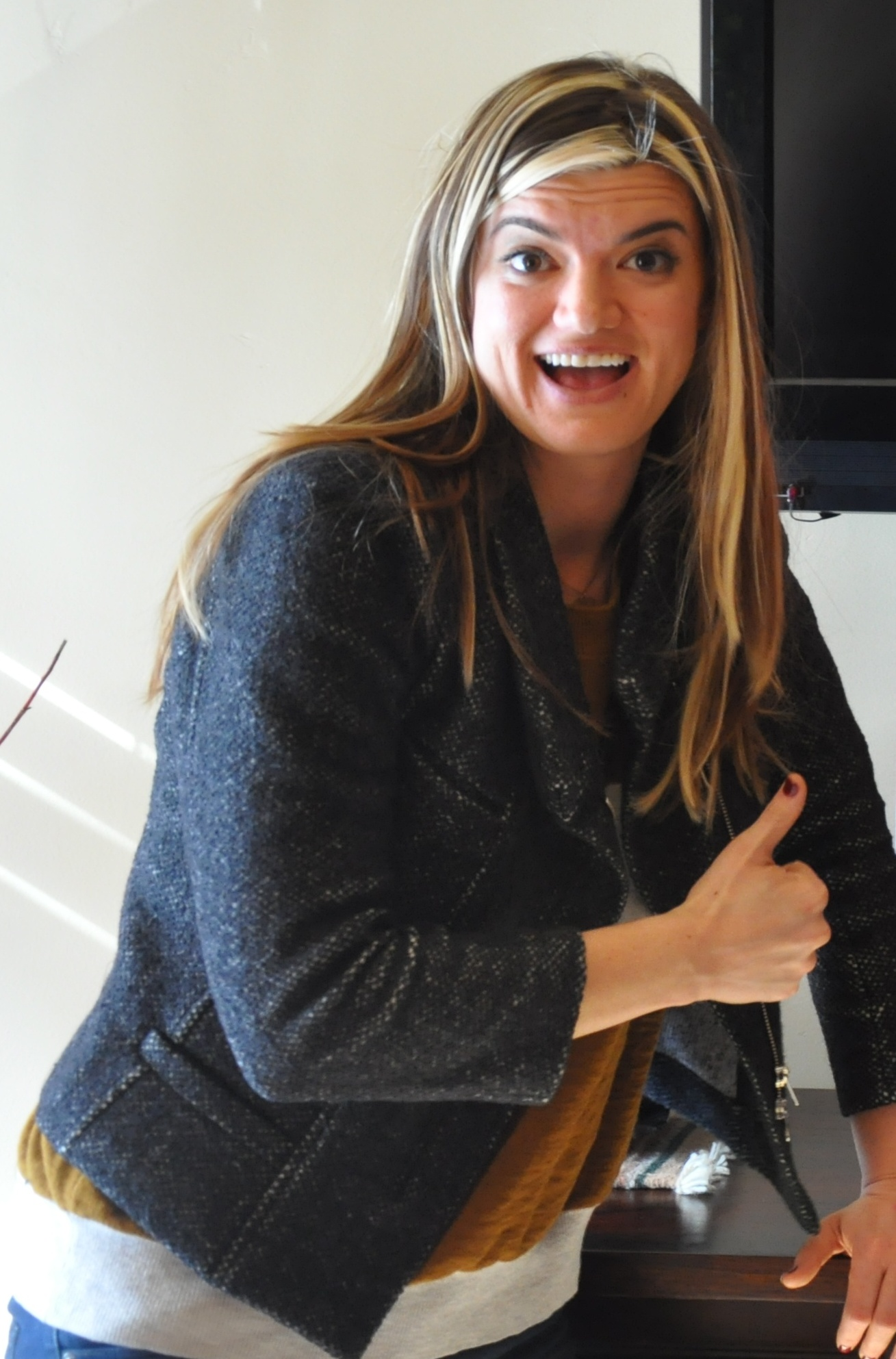
Creator and showrunner Leslye Headland

At the premiere of the film Star Wars: The Rise of Skywalker (2019), television writer Leslye Headland was asked about her interest in the Star Wars franchise and revealed that she was a big fan with many ideas for Star Wars films that she wanted to make if she was asked to by Lucasfilm president Kathleen Kennedy. Headland contacted Lucasfilm to discuss her ideas after completing work on her television series Russian Doll (2019–2022), and pitched a new Star Wars television series with a first-season outline and full series bible. Kennedy agreed to begin work on the series during that initial pitch meeting. In April 2020, Headland was publicly revealed to be writing and showrunning a new female-centric Star Wars series for the streaming service Disney+. Staffing for the series had begun and it was expected to be set in a different part of the franchise's timeline from previous Star Wars projects.

Lucasfilm confirmed Headland's series was in development on May 4, 2020, which is Star Wars Day. At Disney's Investor Day event on December 10, Kennedy announced the title, The Acolyte, and said the series was set at the end of the High Republic era before the events of the main Star Wars films. Lucasfilm executive Rayne Roberts was developing the series with Headland, who was influenced by the games and novels of the Star Wars Expanded Universe (EU). The first season consists of eight episodes, with Headland directing the first two. Alex García López and Kogonada were hired to direct episodes by February 2023, and Hanelle Culpepper was revealed to have directed episodes in March 2024. Executive producers included Headland, Kennedy, Simon Emanuel, Jeff F. King, and Jason Micallef, with Roberts, Damian Anderson, Eileen Shim, and Rob Bredow producing. The budget was initially reported to be around $180 million. Disney later disclosed that the gross budget grew to $230.8 million, with a net budget of $187 million after the company received $43.8 million in tax credits from the UK government.

In March 2024, Headland said she had pitched multiple seasons of the series to Lucasfilm and had a plan for a second season if it was ordered. However, she wanted to take a break after the first season was released due to its long production timeline, and so she could respond to any feedback from fans on the first season when developing the second. After the first season had been released in July, Headland said she had not heard anything from Lucasfilm about making a second season but noted that she had set up future storylines in the first-season finale. In August, the series was canceled after one season when Lucasfilm opted not to continue the series. This was reportedly due to going over budget and having low viewership, with Disney+ having a "high viewership threshold for renewing high-end, big-budget series". The Hollywood Reporter speculated that evolving viewing habits in the streaming era and "the erosion of goodwill of the Star Wars brand" also factored into the decision.

=== Writing ===
A writers' room for the series was assembled by June 2021. Headland made sure the group included writers with different relationships to Star Wars, including some who were only fans of the original trilogy, some who were specifically fans of Dave Filoni's Star Wars projects, and one writer who had never seen Star Wars before. The series' writers included Jason Micallef, Charmaine DeGrate, Jasmyne Flournoy, Eileen Shim, Claire Kiechel, Kor Adana, Cameron Squires, Jocelyn Bioh, and Jen Richards. When pitching the series to Lucasfilm, Headland described it as "Frozen meets Kill Bill". In May 2022, Headland said writing was mostly complete.

Headland wanted to explore the Star Wars franchise from the perspective of the villains. She felt the High Republic era would be the best point in the timeline to do this because the villainous Sith are considerably outnumbered and in hiding during this time. Lucasfilm also wanted to depict the time period on screen after recently launching a publishing initiative set in the era, and because they wanted to explore new parts of the Star Wars timeline away from the films and other series. Headland noted that The Acolyte was the earliest point in the Star Wars timeline to be seen in live-action at that point. She wanted to address some fan criticisms of the Star Wars films, such as how Darth Sidious ascends to power without the Jedi knowing: "How did we get to a point where a Sith lord can infiltrate the Senate and none of the Jedi pick up on it? [What] went wrong?" She considered herself lucky to be able to ask those questions in an actual Star Wars project. A key franchise theme for Headland was "underdog versus institutional threat", and in this part of the timeline it is the Jedi who are the main institution. In contrast to the Jedi in the films, who are monk-like figures in times of war, Headland said the High Republic Jedi live in a time of peace and enlightenment akin to the Renaissance. The series questions the Jedi practice of training children, and also explores differing views on the Force and the amount of power and control that the Jedi have. Headland wanted to portray the Jedi as fallible rather than make them antagonists.

The Acolyte is a mystery-thriller with a serialized story that builds throughout the first season, inspired by the approach of fellow Star Wars series Andor. Because there are no overarching conflicts or wars in the series—Headland said it was "interesting to make a Star Wars with no war in it"—the fight sequences are more intimate, focusing on duels that further develop the characters. Noting that Star Wars creator George Lucas was originally influenced by Westerns and Akira Kurosawa's samurai films, Headland decided to take more influence from martial arts films which she felt were "a little bit more personal and less global and galactic". These included wuxia films by King Hu and Shaw Brothers Studio such as Come Drink with Me (1966) and A Touch of Zen (1971). Similar to the Star Wars series The Mandalorian, The Acolyte includes Easter eggs for fans of the original trilogy, prequel trilogy, and the animated series Star Wars: The Clone Wars, as well as references to the EU and Star Wars Legends. EU references include members of the Theelin and Zygerrian species as well as some narrative elements. The series introduces a coven of Force witches, separate from the Nightsister witches seen in previous Star Wars projects, inspired by mentions of Force cults in the High Republic books and the EU.

Headland took inspiration from the film Rashomon (1950) to depict events from multiple perspectives, specifically the Brendok tragedy which is the central mystery of the series. The third and seventh episodes are entirely flashbacks to the events on Brendok; the third episode tells those events from the perspective of the coven of witches, while the seventh episode tells them from the perspective of the Jedi. This idea of duality is also explored in other ways throughout the series, such as through twin protagonists Osha and Mae. It was important to Headland that the main storyline for the twins was resolved by the end of the season, but other elements such as the relationship between the Jedi and the Galactic Senate were left to be further explored in a second season. She regretted not having the time to explore the character Vernestra Rwoh more in the first season.

=== Casting ===
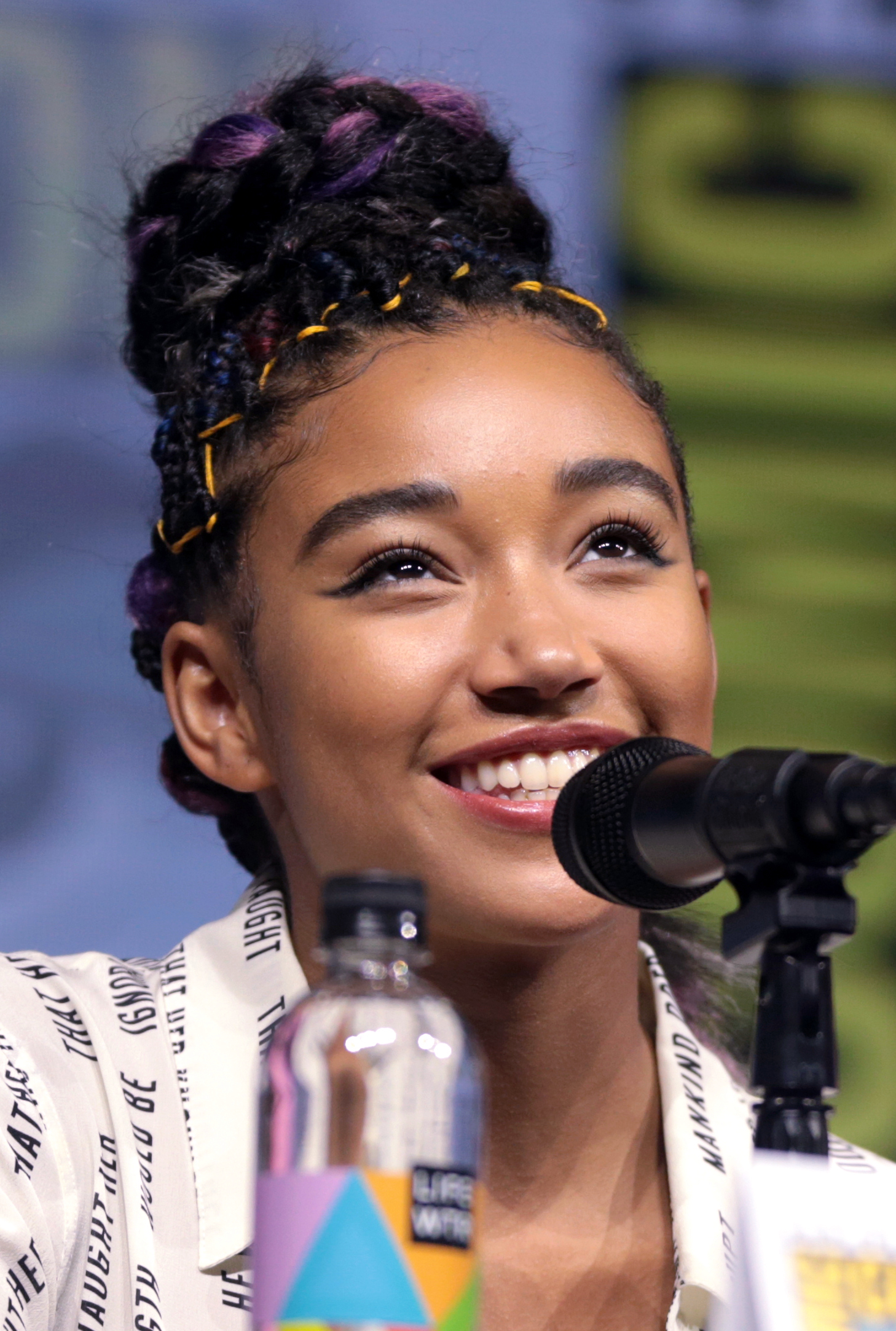
Amandla Stenberg stars in the series as twins Osha and Mae.

Casting was underway by the end of June 2021, when Lucasfilm were looking to hire a young woman of color for the lead role. Amandla Stenberg was in talks for that part in December, and was confirmed to be cast in July 2022. Jodie Turner-Smith and Russian Doll co-star Charlie Barnett entered final negotiations to join the series in September 2022, when Lee Jung-jae and Manny Jacinto were cast. Lee was cast as the male lead, after Headland was impressed with his performance in the television series Squid Game. At the start of November, Dafne Keen was revealed to have a role in the series. Soon after, Lucasfilm confirmed the casting of Stenberg, Lee, Jacinto, Turner-Smith, Barnett, and Keen, and announced the casting of Dean-Charles Chapman, Carrie-Anne Moss, and Headland's wife Rebecca Henderson. Headland had Stenberg, Barnett, and Keen in mind when creating their characters; she wanted to see Keen with a lightsaber after her performance as the character X-23 in Logan (2017). Margarita Levieva was cast by the start of December in what was reported to be a guest role.

At Star Wars Celebration London in April 2023, Joonas Suotamo was revealed to be part of the cast as Wookiee Jedi Kelnacca. Suotamo previously portrayed the Wookiee Chewbacca in the sequel trilogy films and Solo: A Star Wars Story (2018). Also at the convention, Lee, Keen, Barnett, Henderson, and Moss were revealed to be playing Jedi, with Henderson cast as High Republic character Vernestra Rwoh. In March 2024, Headland said Vernestra was the only character from the High Republic books that would appear in the first season, but there were other High Republic characters that she hoped to include in a potential second season. She felt Vernestra was important for showing the state of the Jedi Order in the series, contrasting her role as a leader in the Order with the young prodigy she is depicted as in the books. Also that month, character details for most of the main cast were revealed: Stenberg as the mysterious warrior Mae, Lee as Jedi Master Sol, Jacinto as former smuggler Qimir, Keen as Padawan learner Jecki Lon, Barnett as Jedi Knight Yord Fandar, Turner-Smith as coven-leader Mother Aniseya, and Moss as Jedi Master Indara. Headland said it was a "no-brainer" to cast Moss as Indara given Headland was inspired by Moss's portrayal of Trinity in The Matrix film series when creating the character.

In April 2024, David Harewood was reported to have a small role in the series. At the end of May, a week before the series premiered, Headland confirmed longstanding rumors that Stenberg was actually portraying two characters: Mae and her twin sister Osha. She also said major characters from the films, such as Yoda who is alive during the series' time period, would not be appearing; despite this, Yoda is seen in a brief cameo appearance. A younger version of the Jedi Ki-Adi-Mundi, a character from the prequel films, also appears. Derek Arnold took over for performer Silas Carson.

=== Design ===
The series' creative team included production designer Kevin Jenkins, costume designer Jennifer Bryan, and creature designer Neal Scanlan. Headland explained that the original Star Wars trilogy has a lived-in quality while the prequel films are sleeker and more advanced. With The Acolyte, she carried on this concept of "the further you go back, the more exciting and new and sleek and interesting things look". It was important for her to replicate the white and gold Jedi robes from the High Republic books to symbolize the state of the Order, compared to the brown robes later worn in the films. Bryan and Scanlan worked together on the Stranger's helmet. The helmet is made from the fictional metal cortosis, which temporarily shorts-out lightsabers. Headland was excited to bring cortosis, which was created for the EU, to live-action with the series.

=== Filming ===
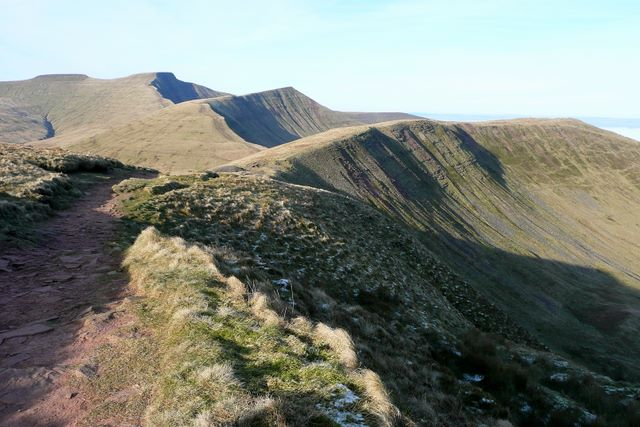
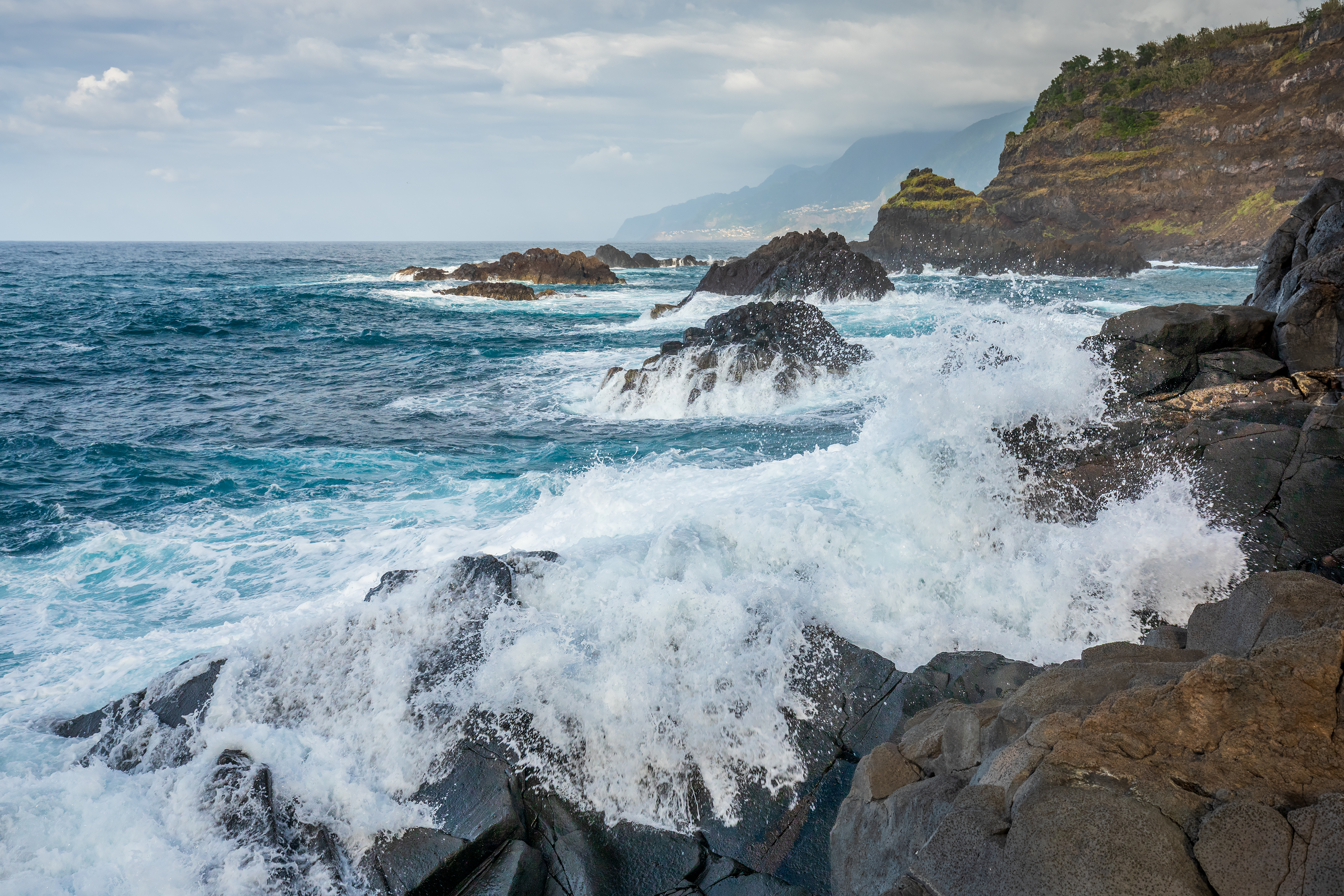
Location filming took place in Brecon Beacons National Park in Wales (top) and around Madeira Island, Portugal (bottom).

Principal photography began by October 30, 2022, at Shinfield Studios in Berkshire, under the working title Paradox. Headland, Kogonada, Lopez, and Culpepper directed two episodes each. Chris Teague and James Friend were the cinematographers, with Teague returning from Russian Doll to work with Headland. The series was initially reported to be using visual effects company Industrial Light & Magic's StageCraft technology to shoot in front of digital backgrounds on a video wall, as was done for The Mandalorian and its spin-off series, but Headland later said the series was primarily filmed on practical sets and did not use the technology, for creative and logistical reasons.

Location filming began in Wales by January 2023, including at Brecon Beacons National Park. From mid to late March, filming took place on Madeira Island, Portugal, including at Fanal Forest and the parishes of Caniçal and Ribeira da Janela. Anderson said Madeira Island was chosen because it offered most of the environments that the production wanted, including ocean access, and had not been used for a major production before. Nearly a quarter of the series was filmed on the island, with that footage appearing throughout the series and not representing a single planet. Anderson said they embraced the location's unpredictable weather. Filming officially wrapped on June 6.

Headland said filming went smoothly despite the length of production and the amount of action sequences and wire-work. She said the cast did most of their own action scenes, including actors who had worked in action before such as Lee, Keen, and Moss. Stenberg, who was new to action, "threw herself into training and did incredible work in a short amount of time", according to Headland.

=== Post-production ===
The series was edited by Miikka Leskinen and Cheryl Potter. Headland said additional dialogue recording (ADR) work could not be completed during the 2023 SAG-AFTRA strike which delayed the end of post-production, but the series was mostly done by March 2024. Julian Foddy was the visual effects supervisor for the series, primarily working with Industrial Light & Magic (ILM) as well as Rising Sun Pictures, Luma Pictures, Hybride, beloFX, and Outpost VFX.

=== Music ===
Michael Abels composed the score for The Acolyte. For the series' seventh episode, Victoria Monét wrote an original end-credits song, titled "Power of Two", with Abels and producer D'Mile; the song was released as a single on June 14, 2024, ahead of the seventh episode's premiere. Walt Disney Records released Ables's score for The Acolyte in two albums: the first volume, covering music from the series' first four episodes, was released digitally on June 21; the second volume, covering music from the final four episodes—including the end-credit version of "Power of Two"—was released on July 19. A 94-track album featuring the contents of both volumes was also made available simultaneously with the release of the second volume. All music by Michael Abels, except where noted:

Star Wars: The Acolyte (Original Soundtrack)
No.	Title	Writer(s)	Artist(s)	Length
1.	"Power of Two"	Victoria Monét; Michael Abels; D'Mile	Victoria Monét	3:17
2.	"A Lone Assassin"			2:07
3.	"The Noodle Shop Fight"			4:14
4.	"Meet Osha"			1:24
5.	"Meknek Spacewalk"			1:18
6.	"Taken Into Custody"			3:42
7.	"Classroom on Coruscant"			1:21
8.	"The Prisoners Escape"			3:42
9.	"Permission to Go to Carlac"			2:00
10.	"Memories on Carlac"			2:48
11.	"Finding Osha"			3:55
12.	"An Acolyte"			1:19
13.	"The Temple on Olega"			3:41
14.	"Teacher and Student"			2:22
15.	"Absolution"			3:12
16.	"Apothecary Shop"			1:30
17.	"You Want Revenge"			2:17
18.	"Combat in the Courtyard"			1:55
19.	"Disappear Into Dust"			1:58
20.	"The Sisters Meet Again"			2:40
21.	"You Found Kelnacca"			2:22
22.	"Khofar Credits"			1:22
23.	"Brendok"			2:19
24.	"Mother Aniseya"			2:16
25.	"Stay Special"			3:33
26.	"The Ascension Ceremony"			3:49
27.	"Standoff"			2:55
28.	"Osha Meets Sol"			1:04
29.	"Power and Who Is Allowed to Use It"			4:20
30.	"Choosing to Leave"			2:07
31.	"The Fire"			3:55
32.	"Left Behind"			1:30
33.	"Under the Bunta Tree"			1:31
34.	"Kelnacca's Den"			2:22
35.	"Journeys End and Begin"			2:28
36.	"Let's Get Going"			1:26
37.	"Fearing a Larger Plan"			2:21
38.	"Forest Trek"			2:34
39.	"Comprehensive Briefing"			0:47
40.	"Bazil's Theme"			1:47
41.	"A Tracker"			1:14
42.	"Umbramoth Attack"			2:31
43.	"Sensing a Loss"			2:15
44.	"Preparing to Face the Past"			1:13
45.	"Dark Master Descends"			3:01
46.	"Very Dark"			1:55
47.	"Awake in the Aftermath"			1:22
48.	"Multicolored Lightsaber Battle"			3:06
49.	"You Are No Jedi / You Are Under Arrest"			3:15
50.	"Dual-Wielding Duel"			2:43
51.	"Battle in Red Green & Blue"			2:37
52.	"A Horrifying Reveal"			3:09
53.	"I've Accepted My Darkness"			1:41
54.	"Two Sisters / Two Stories"			4:14
55.	"Leaving Khofar"			1:52
56.	"What Extraordinary Beings We Are"			2:31
57.	"Prisoner in Paradise"			2:34
58.	"Beach Walk"			1:19
59.	"Code Zero"			1:34
60.	"Bazil Suspects"			0:54
61.	"The Lagoon"			3:47
62.	"Mae in Disguise"			2:01
63.	"Bazil & Pip Strike Back"			1:27
64.	"This is Who You Are"			3:24
65.	"Have You Told Me Everything"			2:48
66.	"A Ship Departs / A Ship Arrives"			1:32
67.	"Interperting a Battlefield"			2:17
68.	"You're Going to Listen"			1:00
69.	"The Helmet Calls"			1:26
70.	"Luxuriosly Dark"			1:26
71.	"A Noble Mission"			2:24
72.	"Sol Discovers the Twins"			2:17
73.	"Preparing to Intervene"			2:55
74.	"Standoff Revisited"			3:03
75.	"Assessments"			2:38
76.	"Those Girls Are the Proof"			1:44
77.	"The Fire Revisited"			3:06
78.	"A Tragic Mistake"			2:51
79.	"Kelnacca Attacks"			4:23
80.	"The Cover-Up Begins"			1:46
81.	"Power of Two (End Credit Version)"	Victoria Monét; Michael Abels; D'Mile	Victoria Monét	4:06
82.	"Helmet Visions"			1:53
83.	"Another Asteroid Field"			1:36
84.	"Converging on Brendok"			2:45
85.	"Memories Among the Ruins"			3:29
86.	"A Great Team"			2:09
87.	"Double Duel"			2:49
88.	"Explanation / Confession"			2:06
89.	"Atonement / Transformation"			3:16
90.	"Pursuing the Twins"			2:43
91.	"Rapprochement / Farewell"			4:07
92.	"Deceptive Elegy"			2:03
93.	"The Acolyte / Homage to a Master"			1:51
94.	"The Power of Many / End Title"			3:17
Total length:				3:49:00

== Marketing ==
Headland and members of the cast presented the first footage from the series at Star Wars Celebration London in April 2023. Stenberg cosplayed as Star Wars character Padmé Amidala for the appearance, wearing a costume based on that character's appearance in the film Star Wars: Episode II – Attack of the Clones (2002) which was created for her by The Acolyte's costume department.

The first trailer was publicly released in March 2024. Charles Pulliam-Moore of The Verge speculated that Stenberg's character could be killing Jedi in the series and highlighted the darker aspects of the trailer. IGN's Ryan Dinsdale noted elements in the trailer that are associated with the High Republic, including the white robes and yellow lightsabers of some Jedi characters, and compared some scenes to the aesthetics of the original and prequel trilogies. Writing for Empire, Ben Travis discussed how the series had been kept a mystery for so long but was finally starting to publicly reveal details. He opined that while Andor focuses on human drama, the trailer indicates that The Acolyte will be going "all-out on colourful species, lightsabers, and Force-users". He praised the small amount of action shown in the trailer. Lucasfilm announced that the trailer was watched 51.3 million times in its first 24 hours, setting a record for the company's streaming series by surpassing the trailers for The Mandalorian, The Book of Boba Fett, Andor, Obi-Wan Kenobi, and Ahsoka.

An exclusive preview of the series was included at the end of 25th anniversary theatrical screenings of Star Wars: Episode I – The Phantom Menace (1999), starting on May 3 in time for Star Wars Day on May 4. Later that month, Lucasfilm and Stenberg released a video of the actor performing John Williams's musical theme for the Force from the Star Wars films on her grandfather's violin. Williams composed a special arrangement of the theme for Stenberg, who was recorded in the newly named John Williams Music Building at Sony Pictures Studios in Culver City, California. Stenberg described the experience as a once in a lifetime opportunity. A world premiere for the series, where the first two episodes were shown, was held at the El Capitan Theatre in Los Angeles on May 23. On May 28, Headland confirmed rumors that Stenberg was portraying two characters in the series, Mae and Osha; before then, the marketing for the series had attempted to hide Stenberg's role as Osha. Lee attended the Monte-Carlo Television Festival in June for the French media launch of the series.

== Release ==
The Acolyte premiered on Disney+ on June 4, 2024, with its first two episodes. The other six episodes were released weekly through July 16.

== Reception ==
=== Viewership ===
Disney announced that the series had 4.8 million views in its first day of release and 11.1 million views across its first five days, marking the streaming service's biggest series premiere of 2024. The five-day viewership was below that of the previous Star Wars series, Ahsoka (14 million views). Nielsen Media Research, which records streaming viewership on U.S. television screens, estimated that the first two episodes were watched for 488 million minutes during the week of June 3. This put it seventh on the company's weekly streaming originals chart. The estimated viewership was lower than the premieres of previous Star Wars series Andor (624 million minutes), Ahsoka (829 million minutes), and the third season of The Mandalorian (823 million minutes). The Acolyte was sixth on Nielsen's streaming originals chart the following week with 370 million minutes viewed, before dropping off the chart in the week of its fourth episode. The series returned to Nielsen's chart in tenth place for the week of its finale episode with 335 million minutes viewed; this was believed to be the lowest for any Star Wars series' finale. With The Acolyte's cancellation in August 2024, Deadline Hollywood and Variety both noted that the series had declining viewership after debuting to strong numbers with its premiere.

Whip Media, which tracks viewership data for the more than 25 million worldwide users of its TV Time app, calculated that The Acolyte was the most-watched original streaming series for U.S. viewership during its first week of release. It dropped to third place on the next week's chart, behind Netflix's Bridgerton and Amazon Prime Video's The Boys, and spent the rest of its run at second place on the chart behind The Boys. JustWatch, a guide to streaming content with access to data from more than 20 million users around the world, estimated that The Acolyte was the top streaming series in the U.S. for the week ending June 9. Data was also published for the weeks ending June 30 and July 14 in which the series was listed seventh on the chart, and it was placed fifth on the company's list for the month of July. Analytics company Samba TV, which gathers viewership data from certain smart TVs and content providers, included The Acolyte in the top ten of its weekly streaming chart for the first three weeks it was released, but the series did not appear on the chart for the rest of its run. Luminate, which also gathers viewership data from smart TVs in the U.S., said The Acolyte was the second-most watched series on Disney+ in 2024 with 2.7 billion minutes viewed, behind only Percy Jackson and the Olympians (3 billion minutes).

=== Critical response ===
On the review aggregator website Rotten Tomatoes, 79% of 252 critics gave the series a positive review. The website's critics consensus reads, "Taking fresh risks with Star Wars lore while having infectious fun playing with the stylistic trappings of a galaxy far, far away, The Acolyte is a Padawan series with the potential to become a Master." Metacritic assigned the series a weighted average score of 67 out of 100 based on 32 critics, indicating "generally favorable" reviews. Initial reviews praised the performances, action scenes, and different take on familiar Star Wars elements, but also called the series "far from perfect".

Reviewing the first two episodes for The Guardian, Graeme Virtue said the series benefited from being a "fresh start" and not requiring any homework to understand like other Star Wars series. Bryan Young at /Film similarly called the series a "breath of fresh air", describing it as a "well-wrought detective story" and positively comparing the action scenes to those of the films Crouching Tiger, Hidden Dragon (2000) and Hero (2002). Anthony D'Alessandro of Deadline Hollywood praised Headland for expanding the franchise, as did Manuel Betancourt at The A.V. Club who said it was an intriguing franchise entry that "thrills precisely for the way it repurposes well-worn Star Wars tropes" while introducing a new story and characters. Liz Shannon Miller, writing for Consequence, found The Acolyte to be bold and fun, calling it a dream project for "anyone curious about the full potential of Star Wars". Alison Herman of Variety said the series was another Star Wars Disney+ success after Andor, "giving itself permission to poke at Star Wars mythology". Herman praised the action sequences for being rooted in the characters. Brian Lowry at CNN said the series' lack of connections to Star Wars canon "prove[d] both an advantage and disadvantage", calling it an "intriguing if modest addition" to the franchise.

Alan Sepinwall of Rolling Stone was more critical of the series, calling it out for re-using elements from the franchise such as a focus on twins and themes of revenge. Rob Owen at The Seattle Times criticized the slow pacing and "dull exposition" of the opening episodes, and lamented the missed potential of killing off Moss's Jedi character in the opening scene. Writing for The Independent, Ed Power criticized the dialogue and felt the combination of martial arts with the Force for the action scenes "doesn't quite work". Empire magazine's James Dyer also criticized the "overly functional" dialogue as well as the "thinly drawn" characters, and expressed concern about Stenberg starring as such a homicidal character. For USA Today, Kelly Lawler complained that the series was "full of logical fallacies, hokey dialogue and nonsensical plots", and felt it contained the worst elements of the Star Wars prequel films. Slate's Sam Adams felt the series "shrinks the world rather than expanding it" and criticized the amount of money spent on "lavish set pieces rather than building out environments".

Reviewing the full first season, Eric Goldman at IGN scored it 6 out of 10. He said Headland raised interesting ideas but they were undermined by "sloppy storytelling and baffling and/or infuriating choices", and there was not enough time to explore them in eight short episodes. Goldman felt Sol was the strongest character of the season and praised Lee Jung-jae's performance, but wished his backstory was better told in the flashback episodes. He said the lightsaber fights were the best of the Star Wars Disney+ series and the action-heavy fifth episode was the standout of the season.

=== Audience response ===
During production and marketing, the series received criticism from some online commentors for being "woke". Specific issues included its initial description as being "female-centric"; the casting of Stenberg, who is non-binary and uses both she/her and they/them pronouns; the overall prominence of women and people of color; and the idea that Headland, who is openly queer and also the first woman to create a Star Wars series, was pushing an "LGBTQ+ agenda". The series was called "The Wokelyte" by some commentors. In May 2024, Kennedy spoke out against personal attacks directed at Headland, primarily by male Star Wars fans. Headland said she did not want to exclude male fans and hoped they liked the series. She empathized with those disappointed by recent entries in the franchise, but rejected complaints related to "bigotry, racism or hate speech". Stenberg said racist responses to her casting had a negative impact on her and people close to her, and she later released a song titled "Discourse" that criticized the intolerance she had faced.

Whip Media reported ahead of the series' premiere, based on the users of its TV Time app, that The Acolyte was the most anticipated new series of June 2024. Following the release of the first two episodes, the series received negative audience ratings on Rotten Tomatoes, Metacritic, and IMDb. This was attributed to a review bombing campaign, partially because many reviews appeared to be generated by AI or new accounts, and because similarly named projects were targeted, including a 2022 Star Wars fan film called The Acolyte and the unrelated 2008 film Acolytes. In addition to complaints about being woke, which were echoed by conservative media, audience complaints about the first three episodes focused on the less positive portrayal of the Jedi and on the creation of Mae and Osha through the Force. These concerns were dismissed by commentators at the time: the series' portrayal of the Jedi was seen as continuing a trend from previous franchise entries such as the prequel trilogy, and the creation of the twins was yet to be fully explained by the series. The appearance of Ki-Adi-Mundi received complaints for contradicting the character's age in non-canon projects. Editors on the Star Wars wiki Wookieepedia received death threats for updating the site to reflect his role in The Acolyte.

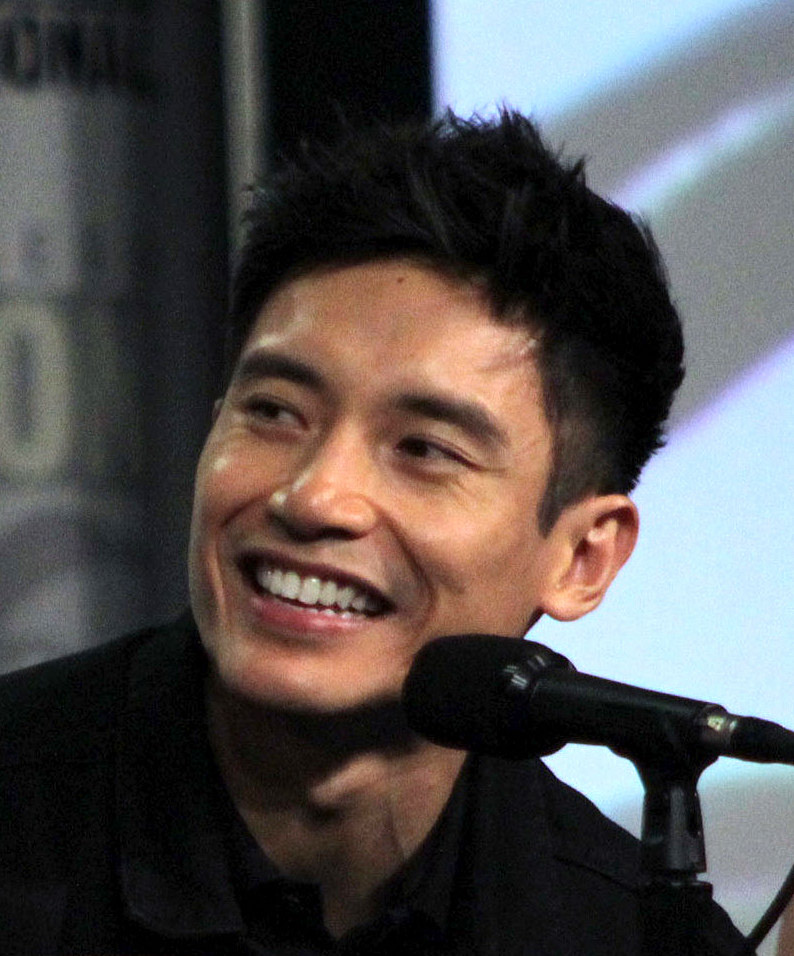
Manny Jacinto portrays the Stranger in the series, who became a standout character for fans.

Following the release of the first-season finale, an online campaign advocating for a second season gained traction. Thousands of social media posts were made using the hashtag "#RenewTheAcolyte", and included positive comments about different elements of the series. Dirk Libbey at CinemaBlend said this was proof that the review bombing did not reflect the views of the entire audience and he was happy to see The Acolyte go viral for a positive reason following all of the negativity it had faced. Following the series' cancellation in August 2024, Variety discussed how The Acolyte had experienced "wildly opposing reception from fans". Some fans and critics enjoyed how the series challenged previous perceptions of the Jedi through the choices of Master Sol, while others felt The Acolyte was antithetical to Star Wars's good vs. evil themes and disliked how the series expanded upon the Force mythology. Deadline Hollywood said the series was "divisive" amongst fans. Stenberg was not surprised by the cancellation because of the cast receiving a "rampage of... hyper-conservative bigotry and vitriol, prejudice, hatred and hateful language" since the series was announced. Multiple publications found Jacinto's the Stranger to be a standout character among fans of the series, and noted that some fans had been excited for where the series could go in a second season following the "tantalizing" story points and characters teased at the end of the first season. Fans launched several social movements to try reverse the cancellation, with the hashtag "#SaveTheAcolyte" trending on X, and a Change.org petition accumulating more than 50,000 signatures by late August.

=== Accolades ===
Year	Award	Category	Nominee(s)	Result	Ref.
2025	Black Reel TV Awards	Outstanding Original Song	Victoria Monét, Michael Abels, and D'Mile (for "Power of Two")	Won	
2025	Hollywood Music in Media Awards	Best Original Song – TV Show/Limited Series	D'Mile (for "Power of Two")	Nominated	
2025	Primetime Creative Arts Emmy Awards	Outstanding Sound Editing For A Comedy Or Drama Series (Half-Hour)	Brian Chumney, Kimberly Patrick, Angela Ang, David Chrastka, Dee Selby, Alistair Hawkins, and Goro Koyama (for "Night")	Nominated	
2025	NAACP Image Awards	Outstanding Original Score for TV/Film	The Acolyte	Won	

=== Lawsuit ===
In March 2023, Karyn McCarthy sued Lucasfilm over breach of contract, alleging that she chose a producer role on The Acolyte over one on the television series Sugar, but after several weeks of work on The Acolyte in April 2022, Lucasfilm chose to end her deal and not pay her for her work so far. By then, the Sugar role was unavailable.

== Tie-in media ==
Marvel Comics published a one-shot comic book on September 4, 2024, that focuses on Kelnacca and bridges the gap between the High Republic publishing initiative and the events of The Acolyte. Titled Star Wars: The Acolyte – Kelnacca, the one-shot was written by High Republic writer Cavan Scott with art by Marika Cresta. In July 2024, two novels based on the series were announced from High Republic writers: Star Wars: The Acolyte – Wayseeker by Justina Ireland, which explores the shared history of Vernestra and Indara; and a young-adult novel focused on Jecki and Yord, written by Tessa Gratton and released on July 29, 2025.
