= Sandleford Priory (country house) =

18th-century country house at Sandleford in the English county of Berkshire

Coordinates: 51.3771°N 1.3164°W

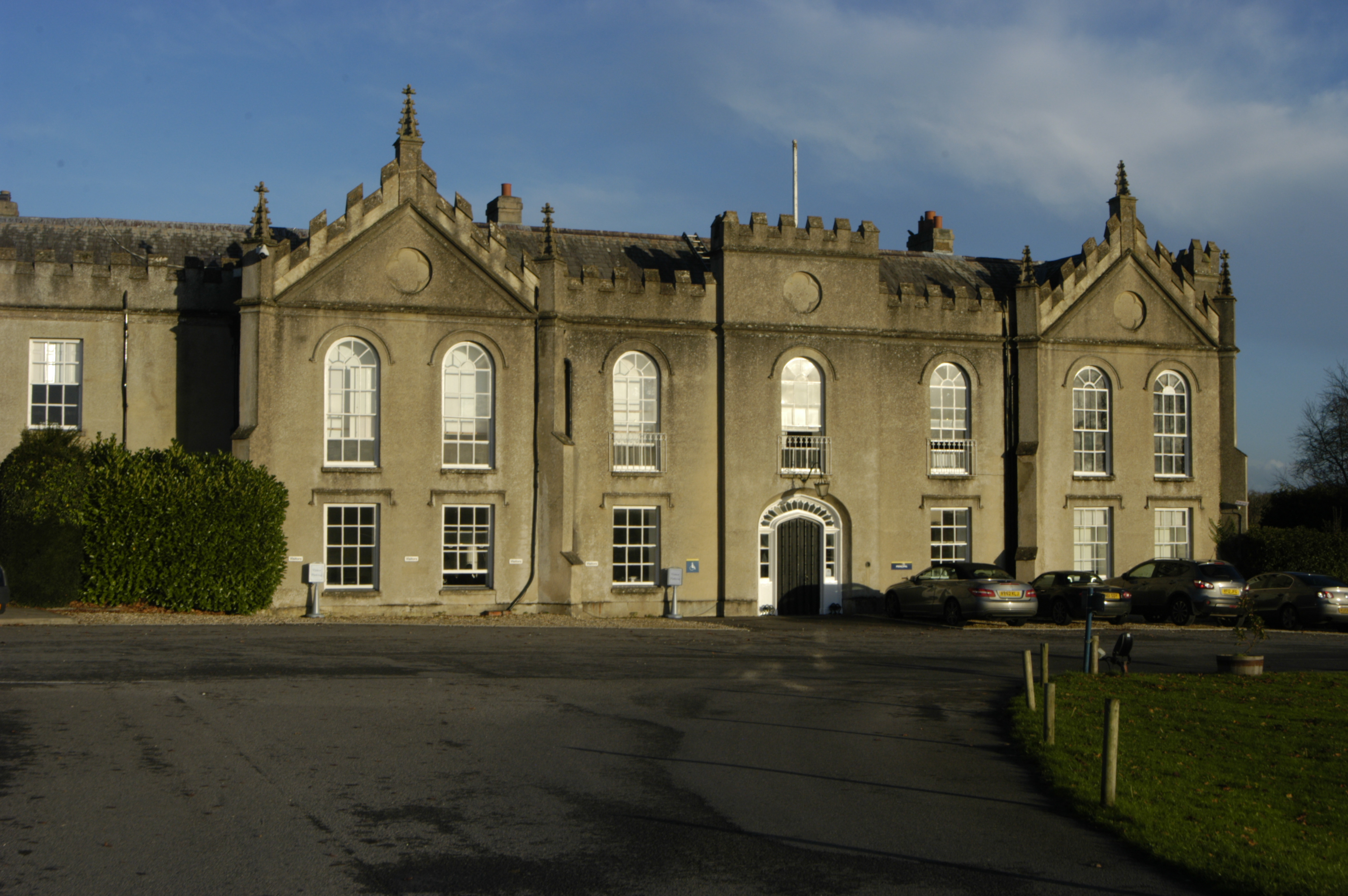
Sandleford Priory

Sandleford Priory is a largely 18th century country house at Sandleford in the civil parish of Greenham in the English county of Berkshire. It incorporates the chapel of a former monastery and is currently the home of St Gabriel's School.

After the old monastery on the site was abandoned by its canons, the estate was given to the Dean and Canons of Windsor. They leased it out as a farm to various tenants before the Kingsmill family from Sydmonton Court converted it into a country house. This was subsequently much extended and elaborated by a later resident, Mrs. Elizabeth Montagu.

== Architecture ==
The present Sandleford Priory is a Grade I listed building in 54 acres (22 ha) of Grade II listed parkland landscaped by Capability Brown. It was mostly erected around the old priory buildings between 1780 and 1786 by James Wyatt, for Elizabeth Montagu.

== Residents ==
Residents have included:

=== Kingsmill family ===
Three generations of the Kingsmill family of Sydmonton leased Sandleford between 1626 and circa 1715. Bridget Colt, Margaret Woodward (Lady Woodard [sic] seem to have been the lessee between Sir Henry Colt and Humphrey Forster), and Anne Forster, three of the seven daughters of Sir William Kingsmill, kt, (died 1618), by his wife Ann Wilkes, were followed by their nephew John, and then finally his son Henry.

- Lease dated, 20 November 1626: Sir Henry Colt (died 1635), of Colts hall or Greys in Cavendish, Suffolk; married (1614) Bridget, fifth daughter of Sir William Kingsmill (died 1618), knighted (May 1603), of nearby Sydmonton Court, Hampshire, where on 18 and 19 August 1603 Sir William entertained King James and his Queen;
- By 3 October 1628, the tenant was Sir John Woodward (died 1659) of Weston-sub-Edge. His wife, Lady Woodward, aka Margaret Kingsmill (baptised 30 August 1598 – died 1664), was the third daughter of Sir William Kingsmill, Kt., by Anna Wilks).
- Before 1668, Sir Humphrey Forster (died 1663), of Aldermaston Court, Aldermaston, sheriff of Berkshire 1619–20; created a baronet in 1620; married (circa 1615/16) Anne (died 1673), eldest daughter of Sir William Kingsmill, kt. (died 1618) of Sydmonton by Anna Wilks;
- Lease dated, 6 May 1668: John Kingsmill, JP (Newbury, 1685), (died 1687), educated Trinity College, Oxford, the third son of Sir Henry Kingsmill (1587-1624/5), kt. (1610), of Sydmonton, by Bridget White (d.1672), of Southwick. They married 20 December 1610. His mother was for over a decade a close friend of the poet John Donne (1572–1631), and John thus may have been named after the poet.

John Kingsmill was husband to Rachael Pitt (died 1690), the second daughter of Edward Pitt the eldest son of Sir William Pitt (1559–1636), MP, kt. 1618, Comptroller of the Household. Edward Pitt (1592–1643), MP (Poole), of Steepleton Iwerne, near Blandford Forum, Dorset and later of Stratfield Saye, Hampshire, which he bought for £4,800 in 1629, had married Rachael (d. 1643) daughter of Sir George Morton, Bart. in 1620.

Their sons (baptised in 1668 and 1670) Robert and Henry Kingsmill died without issue in 1697 and between 9 July 1715 and 4 June 1717, not before Henry Kingsmill of Sandleford was High Sheriff of Berkshire in 1706–1707.George Pitt the brother of Rachel Pitt, Mrs John Kingsmill, married Jane, the daughter of John Savage, 2nd Earl Rivers. John Kingsmill's sister Bridget (1622-c.1700) was wife to Richard Gorges (c.1619–1712), Lord Gorges of Dundalk, MP for Newton (1661), of Stetchworth, Cambridgeshire.

Meanwhile, the poet and Maid of Honor to Queen Mary, Anne Finch, Countess of Winchilsea, (1661–1720), daughter of Sir William Kingsmill, kt., (1613–1661) of Sydmonton Court, was one of John Kingsmill's nieces and a first cousin of his sons Robert and Henry;

- In the early eighteenth century the Pitt family of Strathfield-Saye were thought by the Lysons and Emily Climenson to have been lessees, possibly during the minority of the sons of Rachel Pitt (died 1690), aka Mrs John Kingsmill.

=== William Cradock ===
- William Cradock (died 1736) of Gilling, Hartforth (from 1730) and Gainford Hall, Gainford, County Durham. In 1715 he married Mary daughter of Gilbert Sheldon, of St Andrew's, Holborn. Their daughter Mary married Gilbert Jodrell (died 1745), and in turn their daughter Sarah married Robert Child of Osterley Park;

=== Montagu family ===
- Edward Montagu, FRS (elected 1745), of Allerthorpe, Yorkshire, a distinguished mathematician, was MP for Huntingdon 1734–1768, son of the Hon. Charles Montagu (c. 1658–1721), MP for Durham, and grandson of Edward Montagu, 1st Earl of Sandwich. He inherited in 1758, on the death of his lunatic first cousin, John Rogers (1685–1758), the coal-mines of the Denton Hall estate, East Denton, Newcastle, Northumberland, which had been bought by their grandfather in 1689 and 1705; he was the leaseholder of the Sandleford estate from 1730. Sandleford had been in possession of the first cousin (Rachael Pitt, Mrs. John Kingsmill, of Sandleford) of his first cousin, Edward Wortley-Montagu (1678 –1761), the husband of Lady Mary Wortley Montagu. Sandleford belonged to the Dean and Canons of Windsor, Robert Freind (1667–1751), a Canon of Windsor, the Canon of the Second Stall, from 29 April 1729 to 1737, was father of William Freind (c.1715–1766) whose wife Grace Robinson (1718–1766) was sister and co-heir of Edward's wife's cousin, Richard Robinson, 1st Baron Rokeby. Meanwhile, Sir Sidney Meadows (1701–1792), Kt., MP, of Conholt, Chute, Andover, was a brother-in-law having married his sister Jemima in 1742;

Dear Brother, [William or more likely Matthew, 2nd Lord Rokeby] It would be with much greater pleasure I should take up my pen to tell you I am at Sandleford, if I could flatter myself with the hope of alluring you to it: you would find me in the character of a farmeress. The meagre condition of the soil forbids me to live in the state of a shepherdess-queen, which I look upon as the highest rural dignity.The plough, the harrow, and the spade remind us that the golden age is past, and subsistence depends on labour; prosperity on industrious application. A little of the clay of which you complain, would do us a great deal of good. I should be glad to take my dominions here from the goddess Ceres to give them to the god Pan, and I think you will agree with me in that taste; for wherever he presides, there Nature's republick is established... ... At Sandleford you will find us busy in the care of arable land. By two little purchases Mr. Montagu made here, my farm contains six hundred acres. As I now consider it an Amazonian land, I affect to consider the women as capable of assisting in agriculture as much as the men. They weed my corn, hoe my turnips, and set my Pottatoes; and by these means promote the prosperity of their families.

— Mrs Montagu described the land and farming at Sandleford in this letter to one of her brothers, dated Sandleford, June 9, 1777. (From The Monthly Magazine, volume 29, edited by Richard Phillips, London, 1810, page 558).
- Mrs. Montagu (from 5 August 1742), aka Elizabeth Robinson, the blue-stocking, Edward Montagu's wife and then widow. Sister of Matthew (Matt) Robinson, FRS (elected 1746), MP (for Canterbury 1747–1761), Sarah Scott (1720–1795), Charles, MP (for Canterbury 1780–1790) and Rev. William Robinson (1727–1803) who was rector of Denton, 1764–1785, and of nearby Burghfield, 1767–1800, when succeeded by his son Rev. Matthew Robinson (died 1827). Sir Thomas Robinson, 1st Baronet was a kinsman. Rev. Laurence Sterne (1713–1768) married one of her first cousins. Her heir was her nephew, Matthew Montagu, FRS, MP, who succeeded to her estates in Yorkshire and Northumberland, and to Sandleford, in 1800, though he had already been living with her and there for years; In a letter to one of her brothers, dated Sandleford, 9 June 1777, Mrs Montagu wrote about her agricultural relationship with Sandleford. She commissioned Capability Brown to work on the landscape and house.
- Matthew Montagu (previously Robinson) (1762–1831), MP, FRS (elected 1795), 4th Baron Rokeby, in the peerage of Ireland, from 1829. He was Mrs. Montagu's favoured nephew, under whose wish he took the name of Montagu in 1776, and son of Morris Robinson of the Six Clerks' Office, Chancery Lane, London. Wraxall in his Memoir described Montagu's upbringing by his aunt: At her feet he was brought up, a school more adapted to form a man of taste and improvement than a statesman or a man of the world. Educated at Harrow and Trinity College, Cambridge, he married Elizabeth, daughter and heir of Francis Charlton of Kent in 1785 by whom he had six sons and seven daughters. A 'faithful follower of Pitt', he was MP for Bossiney 1786–1790, for Tregony 1790–1796, and for St. Germans 1806–1812; Major commandant Newbury voluntary infantry 1803, lt.-col. commandant. 1803. In addition to holding the lease of Sandleford he bought land in the adjacent manor of Peckmore, (next to Greenham), a name a mix of Perche and moor; Matthew Robinson may have been influenced by or even employed Humphrey Repton at Sandleford as a result of having seen what he had done for the father of his patron at St. Germans, Lord Eliot of Port Eliot, in 1792–93 and 1802.

==== Montagu visitors ====
- Robert Adam, employed by Mrs Montagu in 1765 at Sandleford;
- Hannah More (1745–1833), friend of Mrs. Montagu;
- Elizabeth Vesey (1715–1791), friend and adviser of Mrs. Montagu;
- Margaret Bentinck, Duchess of Portland (1715–1785), of Bulstrode Park, friend of Mrs. Montagu;
- William Pulteney, 1st Earl of Bath;
- Dr. Beattie, (James Beattie the poet), stayed at Sandleford with his son in July 1791;
- George Harcourt, 2nd Earl Harcourt (1736–1809), of Nuneham House, friend and garden adviser to Mrs. Montagu;
- Mary Delany, aka Mrs. Pendarves, (1700–1788), friend of Mrs. Montagu;
- Lancelot Brown (1716–83), Capability Brown, provided plans for the park and garden in 1781;
- John Spyers (Spyres, Spiers, Spires), (c1720-1798), nurseryman and draftsman, Mr. Brown's surveyor;
- James Wyatt, architect;
- Joseph Bonomi the Elder, architect;
- Samuel Lapidge, took over from Brown in the park and garden. Father of Edward Lapidge;
- William Emes, also took over garden landscaping after Brown's death;
- Sir Richard Jebb, 1st Baronet, introduced Mrs Montagu to the whiskey, a one-horse chair (chariot), which she used to get around her scenic acres at Sandleford;
- Miss Gregory (1754–1830), Dorothea Gregory; wife (from 1784) to Archibald Alison (author) (1757–1839), daughter of John Gregory, sister of James Gregory (physician) and mother of Sir Archibald Alison, 1st Baronet and William Alison. Invaluable companion to Mrs. Montagu, especially at Sandleford;
- Rt. Rev. Richard Pococke (1704–1765), Bishop of Ossory and Meath, collected Cedar of Lebanon seeds in Lebanon in 1738, some of which are known to have been planted at Highclere Castle and Wilton House, but probably also at Sandleford and his family's own Newtown House, Hampshire;
- Richard Durnford, Bishop of Chichester, his mother Louisa (born 1781) was a daughter of John Mount (1725–1786) of Wasing was born at Sandleford. John Mount was also a grandfather of William Mount, (1787–1869), MP.
- Matthew Montagu was a friend and supporter of William Wilberforce, and thus favoured the abolition of the slave trade. Wilberforce, stayed at Sandleford, 27–28 July 1789:

27th. Set off for Bath and reached Sandleford. The old lady [Elizabeth Montagu] wonderfully spirited, are all very kind in their reception. 28th. Almost compelled to stay with the Montagus all day. Mrs. Montagu senior has many fine, and great, and amiable qualities. Young Montagu all gratitude and respect and affection to her and of most upright and pure intentions.

Wilberforce was at Sandleford one night in July 1791:

Monday 28 July. Off betimes on Sierra Leone business-reached Sandleford (M. Montagu's) in the evening. Dr. Beattie was already arrived.

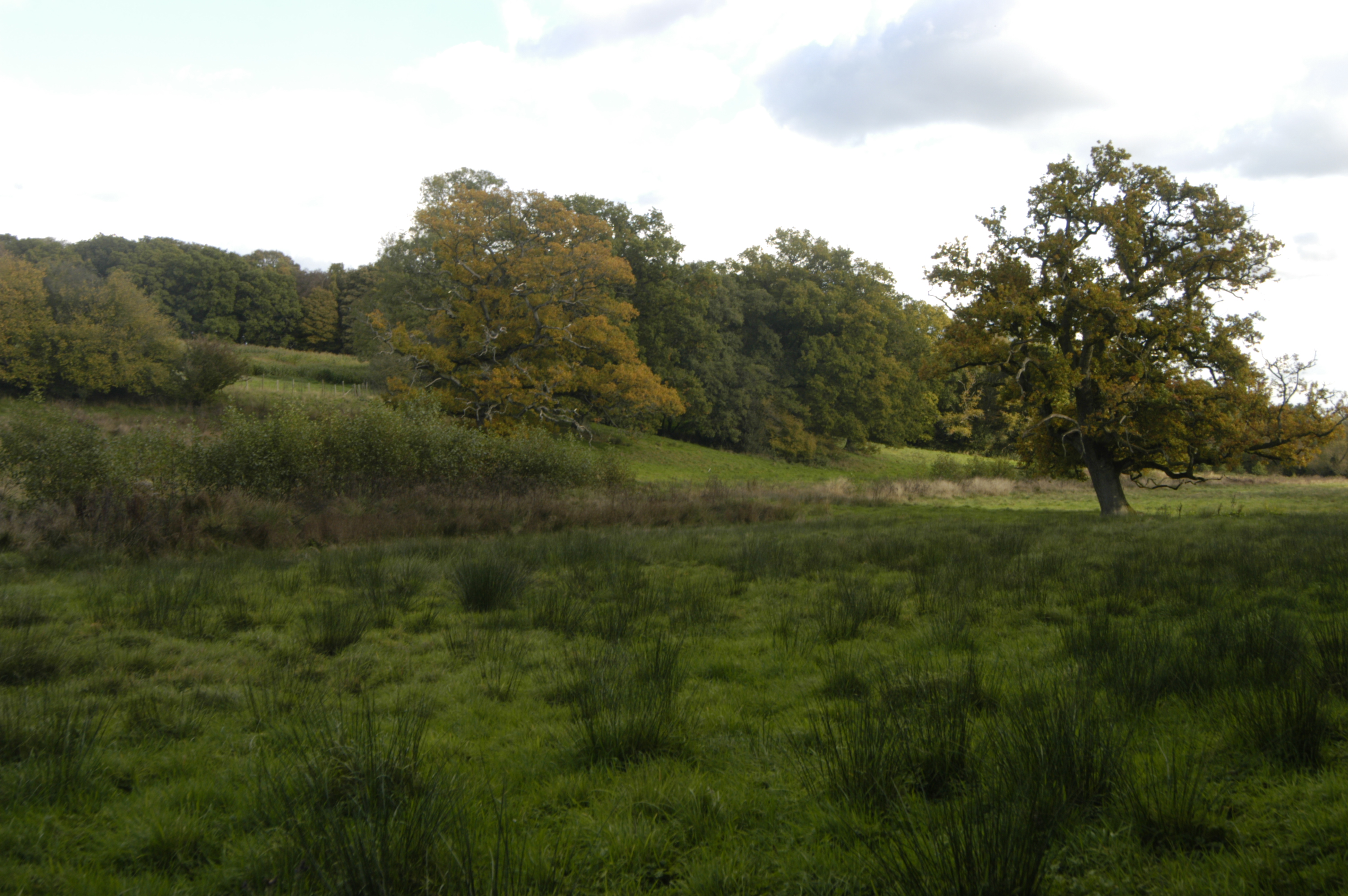
North of Barn copse, Looking north-easterly towards Slockett's Copse.

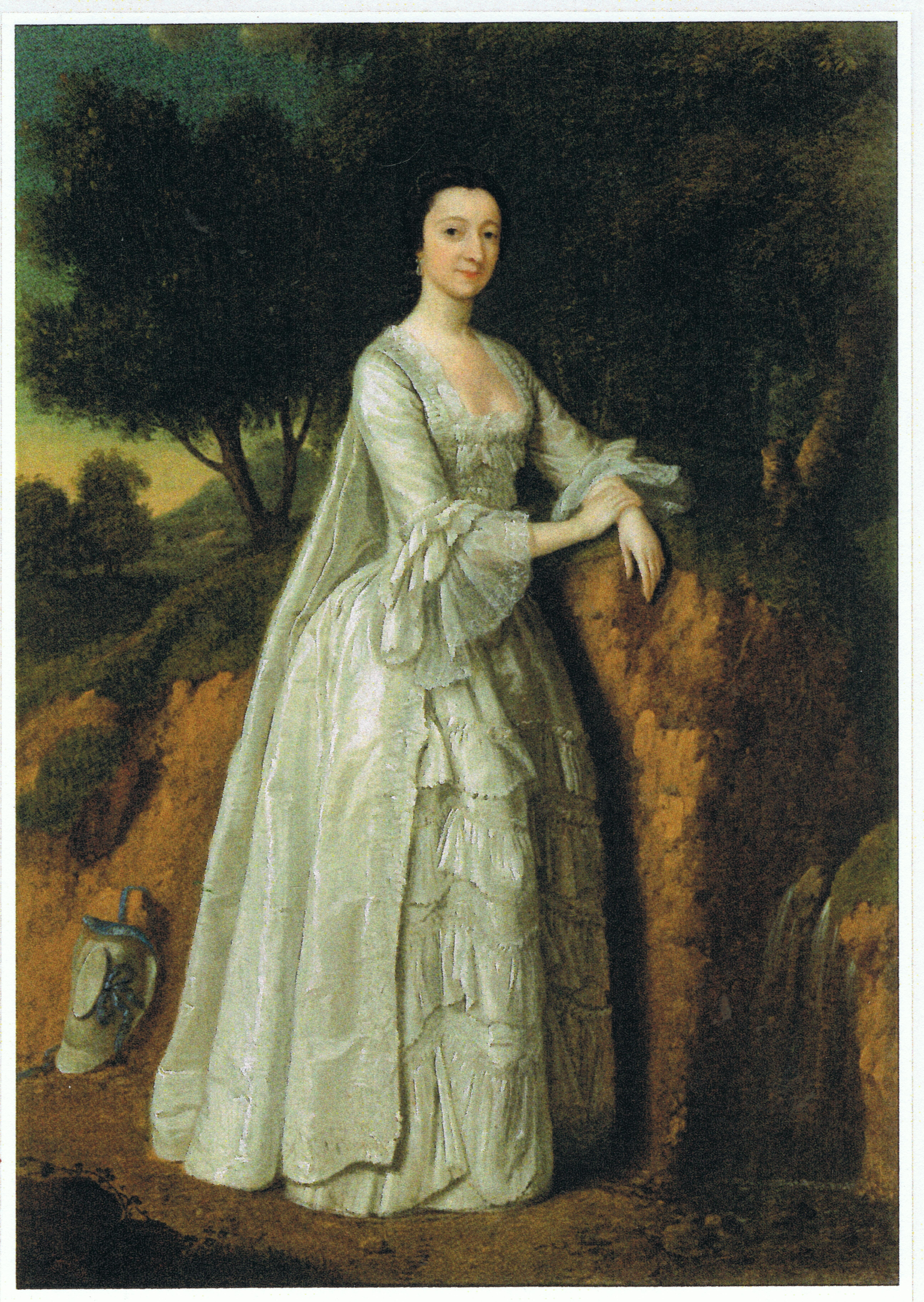
Presumed to be Elizabeth Montagu (1718 – 1800) in a Sandlefordesque landscape, by Edward Haytley (died 1761)

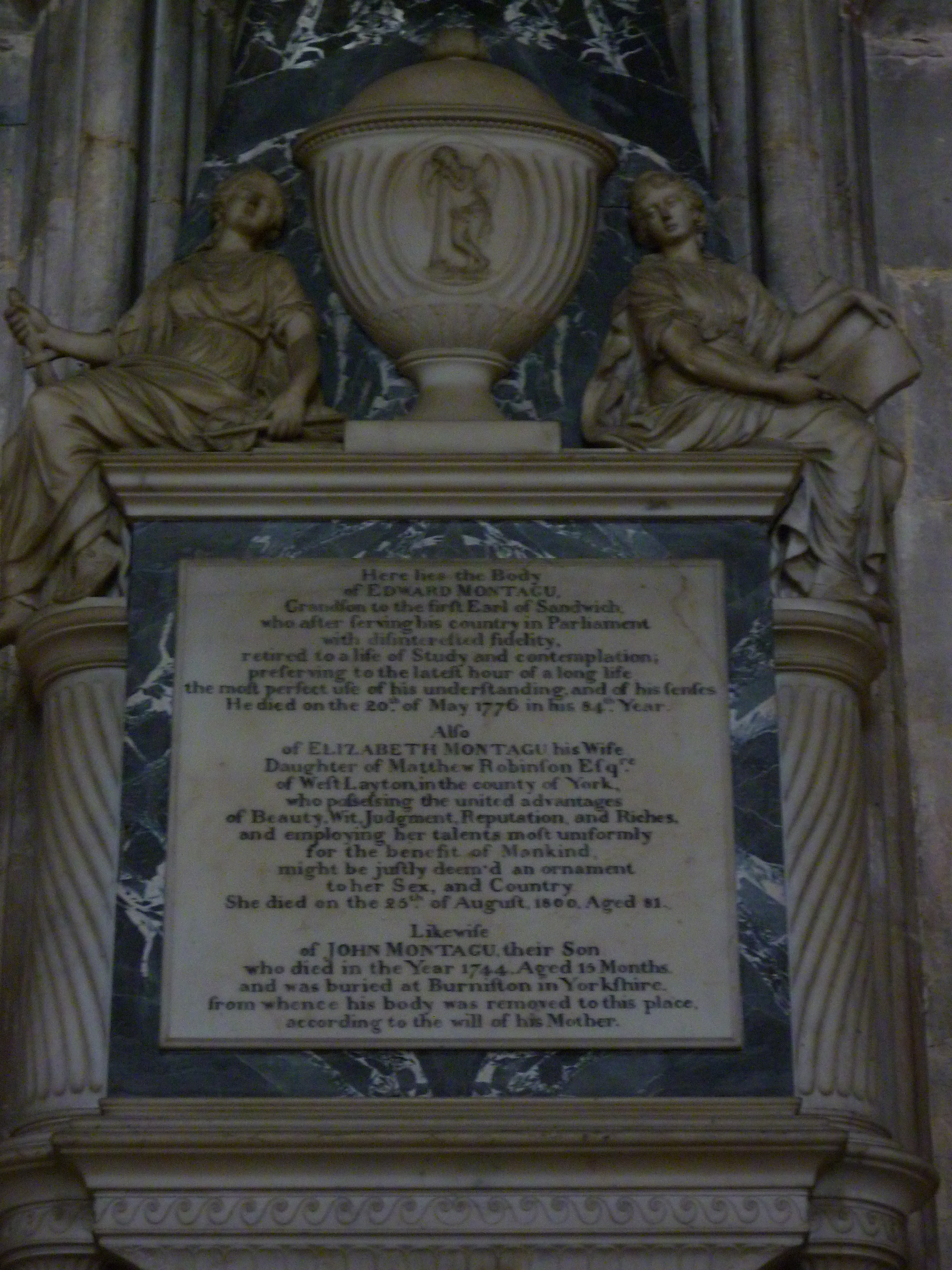
Memorial to Edward and Elizabeth Montagu, and their son John (Punch), north aisle, Winchester Cathedral.

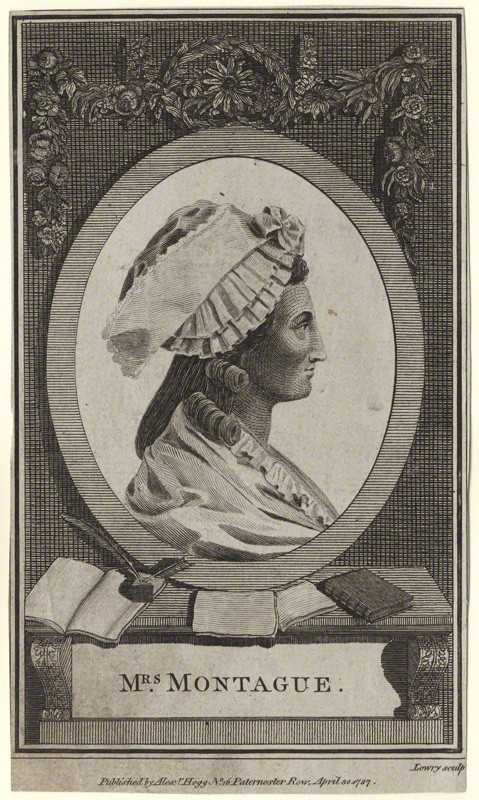
Elizabeth Montagu by Wilson Lowry (1762–1824) engraving published London, April 1787.

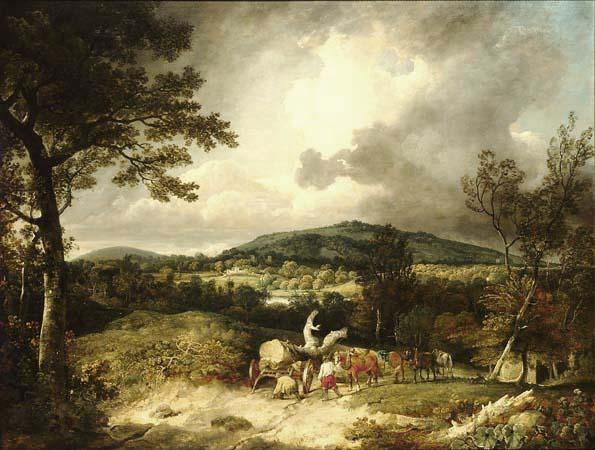
A view south across Newtown from Sandleford by George Arnald (1763–1841), Wood gatherers, with Highclere Castle, and Beacon and Siddon hills in the distance, 1805.

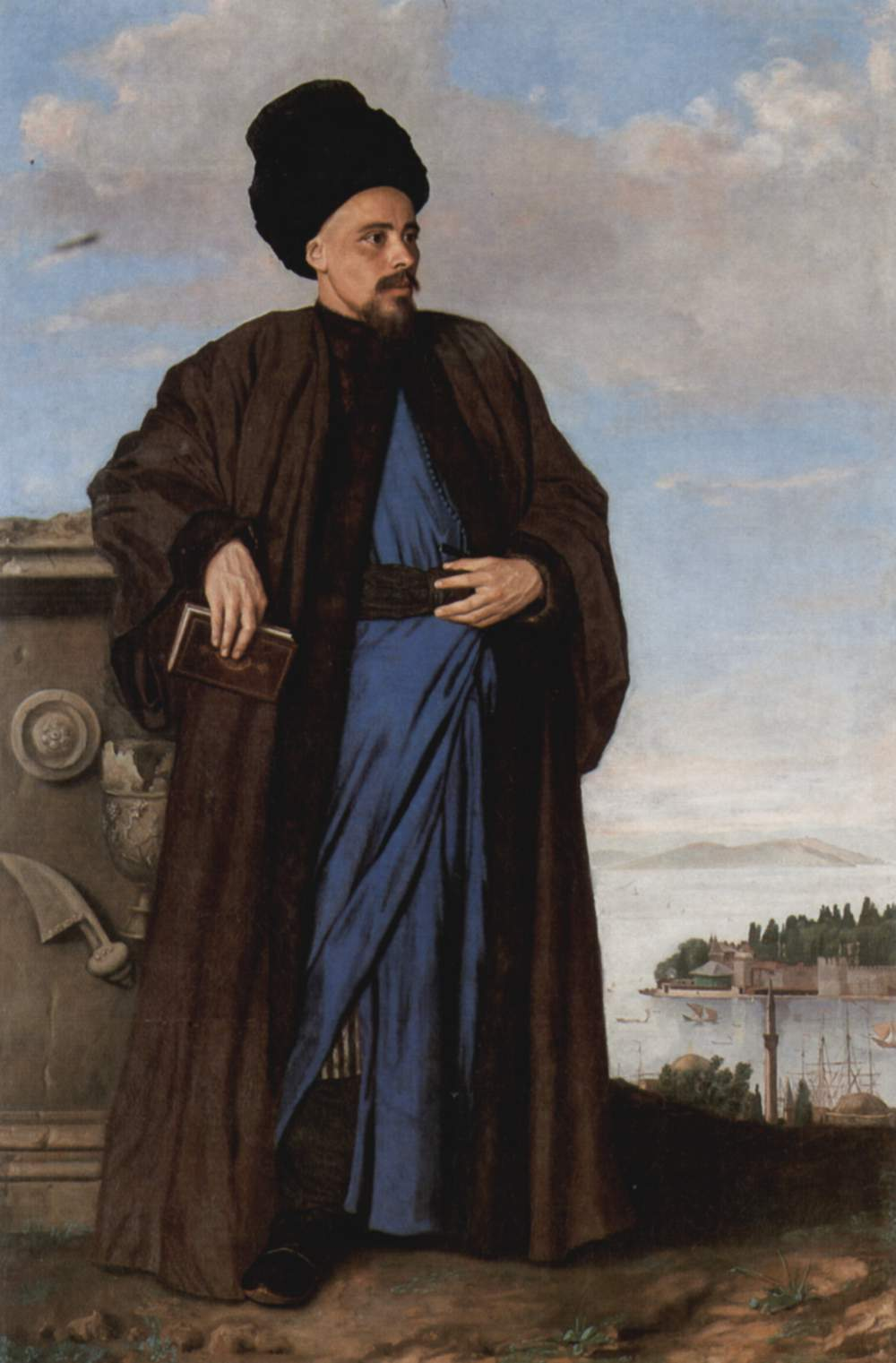
Rt. Rev. Richard Pococke (1704–1765), by Jean-Étienne Liotard. Sometime guest and neighbour.

=== William Chatteris ===
William Pollet Brown Chatteris (1810–1889), JP, DL (1852, Berks), educated at Eton and Brasenose college, Oxford, and son of a City of London banker, William Chatteris (died 1819) of Lombard street, who eventually bought the freehold, enfranchised the estate, from the Ecclesiastical Commissioners, in 1875. The Dean and Canons of Windsor (with Westminster Abbey and the cathedrals of England and Wales) having been obliged to hand over their lands to the Ecclesiastical Commissioners, now the Church Commissioners, on 26 June 1867. At the time of the 1851 census Chatteris and his wife lived in the priory with an indoor staff of 12; butler, footman, under-butler, housekeeper, lady's maid, cook, laundry maid, three house maids, kitchen maid, and a scullery maid. One of his sisters, Eliza (died 1866), had married Edmund Arbuthnot (1793–1873) of Newtown in 1824, Sandlefords's closest village, which would have been Chatteris' introduction to the area as he took on the lease of Sandleford in 1835. His first wife (married 1833) was Anne (died 1848) eldest daughter of Rt Rev Alexander Arbuthnot, DD, Bishop of Killaloe (1768–1828), and his brother-law Edmund's first cousin. He planted a world-class azalea and rhododendron garden. He died at Sandleford Priory leaving £155,141, his executors were his former half-brother-in-law Sir Charles George Arbuthnot, GCB, (1824 –1899), and the Rev. Frances Charles Gosling, vicar in charge of Newtown, 1859–1900. Another half-brother-in-law Sir Alexander John Arbuthnot, KCSI CIE (1822–1907) lived at nearby Newtown house;

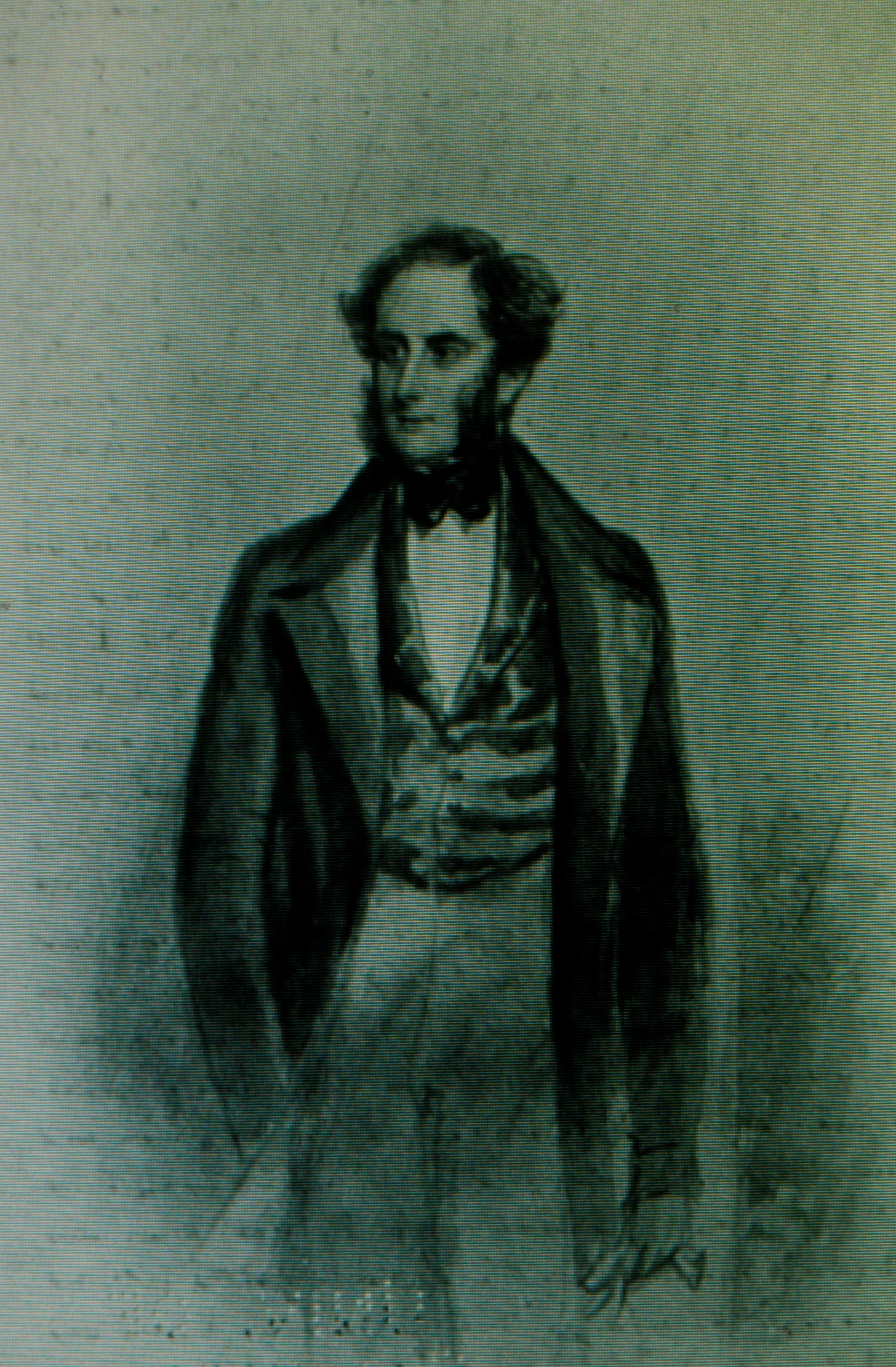
William Pollett Brown Chatteris by Simon Jacques Rochard (1788–1872), 1842.

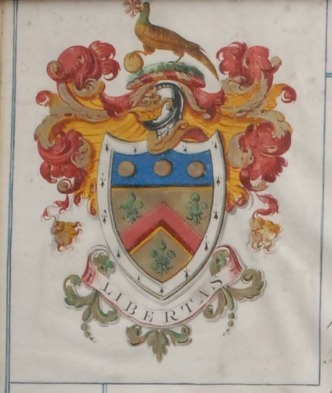
A hand scrivened and illuminated vellum detail of the Chatteris coat of arms on the grant of arms dated 30 May 1829, to William Pollett Brown Chatteris.

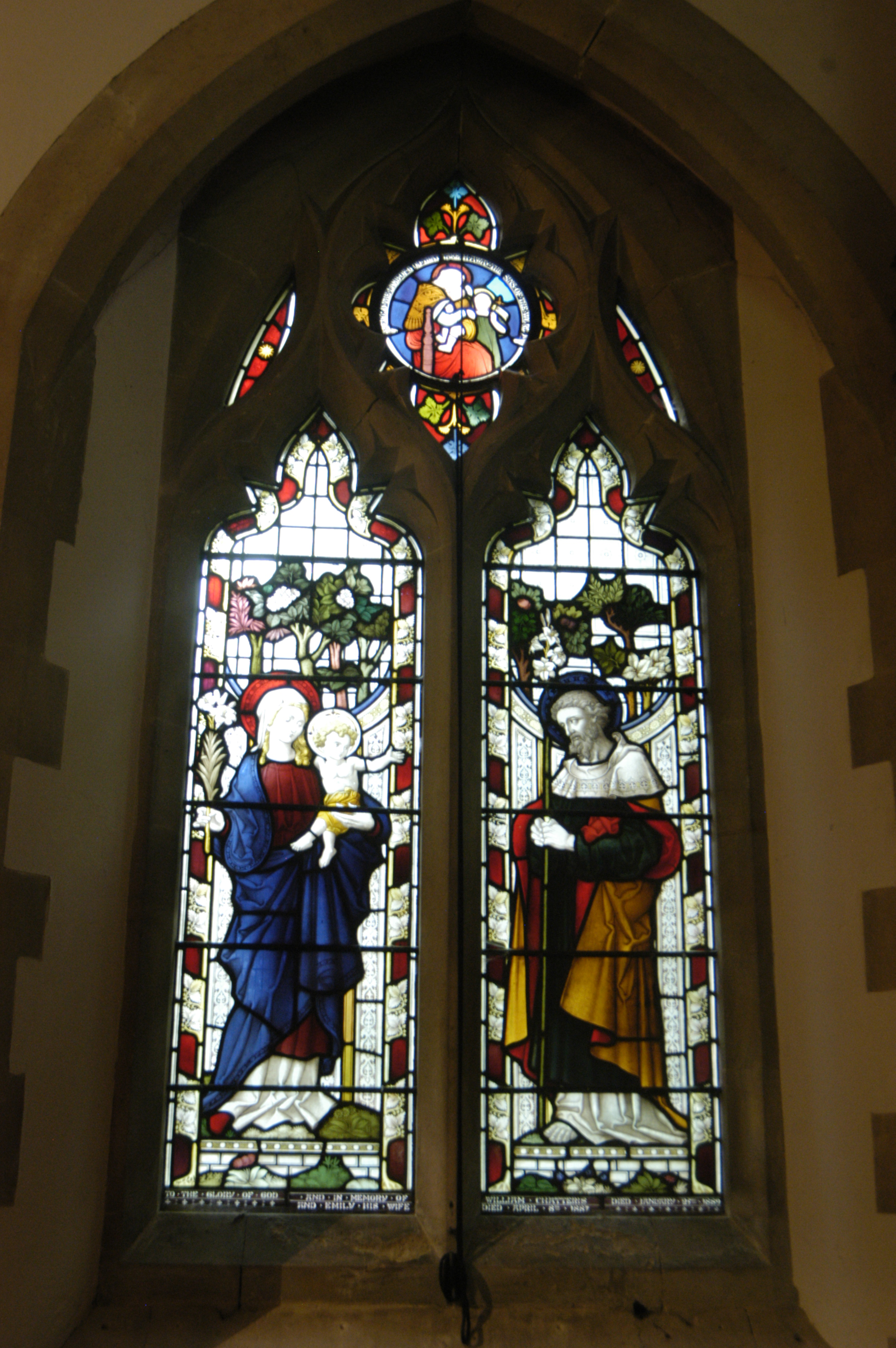
Stained glass in memory of William Chatteris and his wife, circa 1890, in Newtown.

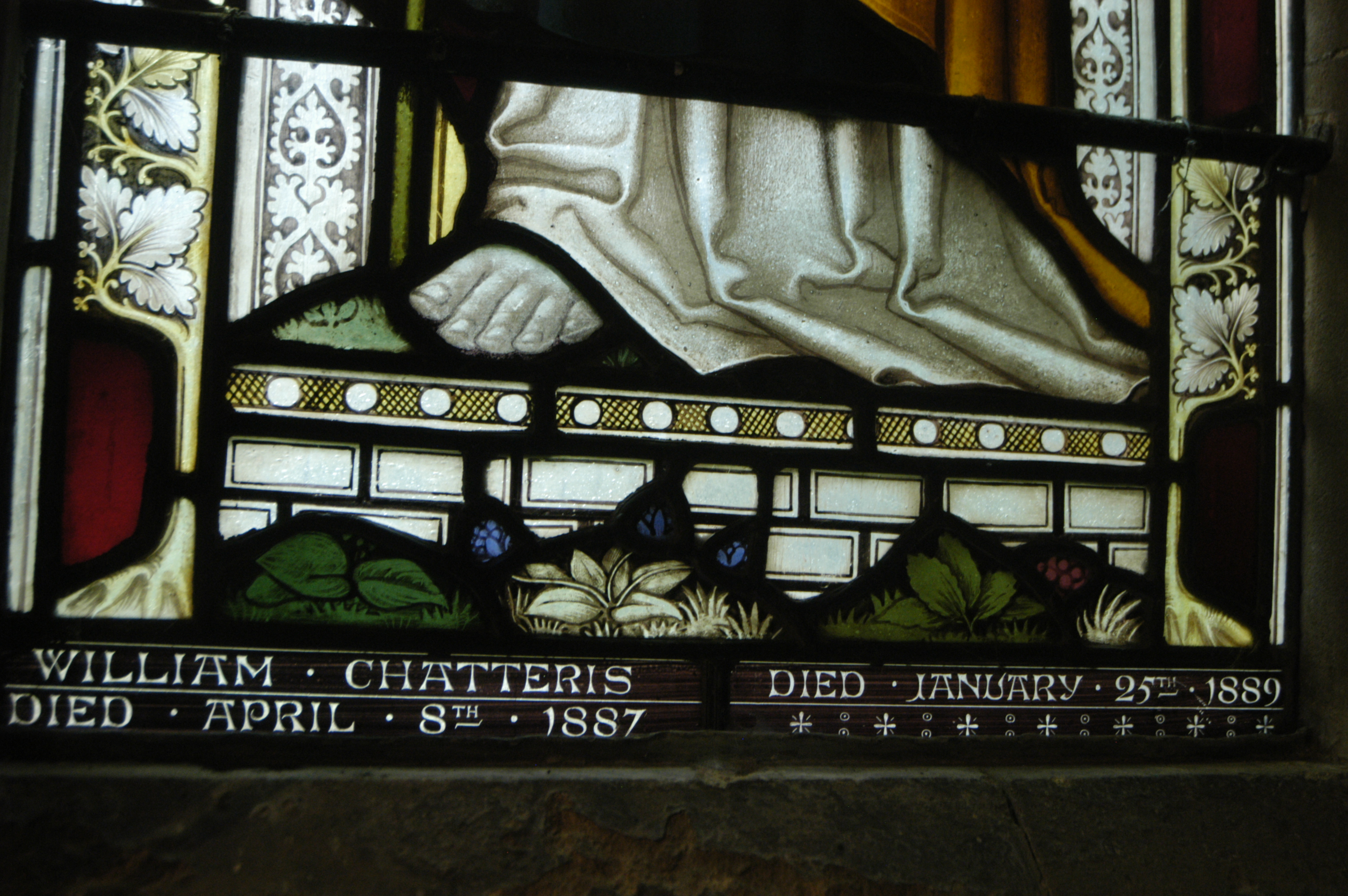
Detail of stained glass in memory of William Chatteris and his second wife, circa 1890, in Newtown.

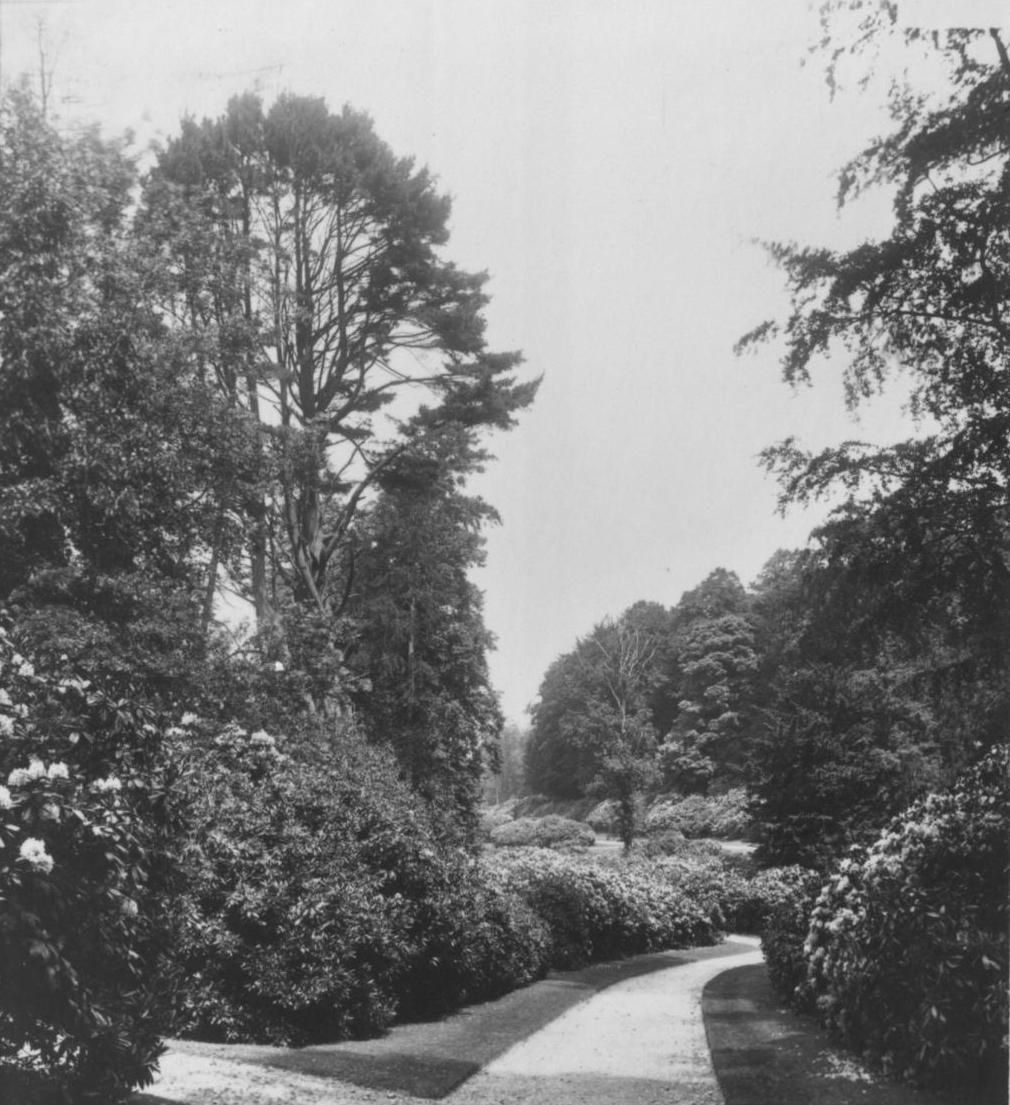
Azaleas and rhododendrons planted near the priory by William Chatteris, as seen circa 1906.

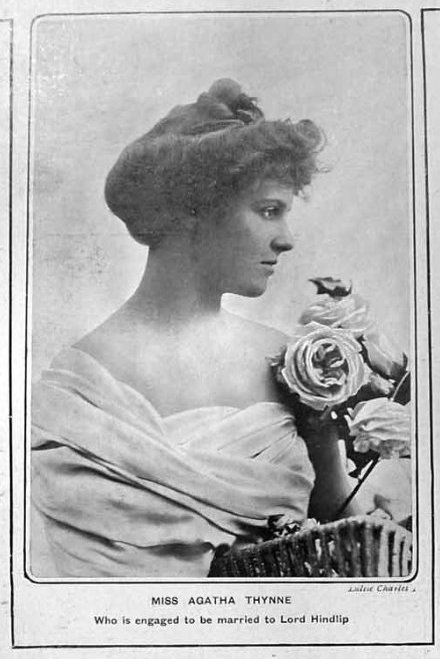
Agatha Lillian Thynne, in The Tatler, no. 138, 17 February 1904.

=== Later residents ===
- Miss Agatha Lilian Thynne (died 1962), Alpin Mac Gregor's niece, (and descended from Thomas Thynne, 2nd Marquess of Bath), was wife of the 3rd Baron Hindlip, and is hence a great-grandmother of Kirstie Allsopp. Her mother Mary Elizabeth Murray Mac Gregor (died 1934) and father John Charles Thynne (1838–1918), sometime receiver general to the Dean and Chapter of Westminster (1865–1902), were living at Sandleford Cottage in 1907, (they had married in Westminster Abbey on Abbey on 25 April 1871). Her sister Joan E. M. (1872–1945) was the mother of John Campbell, 5th Earl Cawdor.
- Mrs. Henrietta Myers (Toxteth, Liverpool, 1832–1919), widow of guano and Liverpool shipping merchant Charles Myers (1827–1879), JP, of Botleigh and Swanmore, Bishops Waltham, Droxford, Hampshire, and director of Ismay Imrie & Co (White Star Line), was tenant from before 1898 until circa 1919. Her daughter Evelyn Elizabeth Myers (born Woolton, circa 1872-died June 1909) wrote A History of Sandleford Priory, with plates, Newbury District Field Club, Special Publication. no. 1. She had finished it by December 1906 but it was not published until 1931. She had an elder sister called Henrietta Constance (Woolton, 1866-died at Greenham Court, 1927). One brother was Rev. Canon Charles Myers (1856–1948), canon of Salisbury Cathedral, another was William Henry Myers (1854–1934), JP, DL, MP, of Swanmore House. Evelyn Myers' first cousin Major William Joseph Myers (1858–1899, killed at Battle of Ladysmith) was a prolific collector of Egyptian antiquities and of Arab glass and wall tiles.

At the time of the 1911 census Sandleford Priory was inhabited by two males and 14 females. Henrietta Myers (aged 79), her surviving daughter Henrietta Constance Myers (44), and a cook-housekeeper (66), two lady's maids (64 & 48), two laundry maids (20 & 38), three house maids (24, 24, & 22), kitchen maid (26), scullery maid (20), and two footmen (23 & 20).

- Major Aubrey Isaac Rothwell Butler, (1878–1930), son of Isaac Butler (1839–1917), JP (Sheriff of Monmouth 1910), of Panteg House, Griffithstown, Torfaen, near Newport. It is claimed that the first sheet steel in Britain was rolled in Staffordshire in 1876 from a bloom made in Panteg by Isaac Butler. Aubrey Butler was sometime manager of Baldwin's Ltd branches in Monmouth & Midlands, Baldwins having taken over the family firm, Wright, Butler and Co Ltd, in 1902. Later he was Sheriff of Monmouthshire, 1924, and by the time of his early death was described as formerly of Sandleford Priory and of 13, Porchester Terrace, London.
- Lady Mary Florence Holt (1877–1957), daughter of the 12th Earl of Meath, by Lady Mary Jane Maitland, daughter of 11th Earl of Lauderdale, and wife (from 4 June 1904) to Lt.Col. Harold Edward Sherwin Holt (1862–1932), TD, CBE, MIEE, FRGS, MA; educated at Eton and Magdalen college, Oxford; a mechanical and electrical engineer and inventor; sometime director of Daimler; Lord of the manor of Farnborough; of Ogbeare Hall, North Tamerton, Devon and Hornacott Manor, Boyton, Launceston, Cornwall; and founder member of the RAC and the Society for Psychical Research; hon. lieutenant-colonel in RAF and Hants Carabiniers Yeomanry. Meanwhile, Lady Mary's sister Lady Violet Constance Maitland (1886–1936) married the 4th Earl of Verulam in 1909. Lady Mary's brother, Reginald Brabazon, 13th Earl of Meath, married Lady Aileen May Wyndham-Quin (1873–1949), a daughter of Windham Wyndham-Quin, 4th Earl of Dunraven and Mount-Earl. There were two Holt sons: Adrian John Reginald (1907–1967) and Geoffrey Brabazon (1907–2008). Lady Mary sold the priory's furniture and outside effects, and presumedly the house in 1947, and St Gabriel’s School opened in 1948;
- Congregation of Our Lady of Charity of the Good Shepherd, of St. Gabriel's School;

== Landscape ==
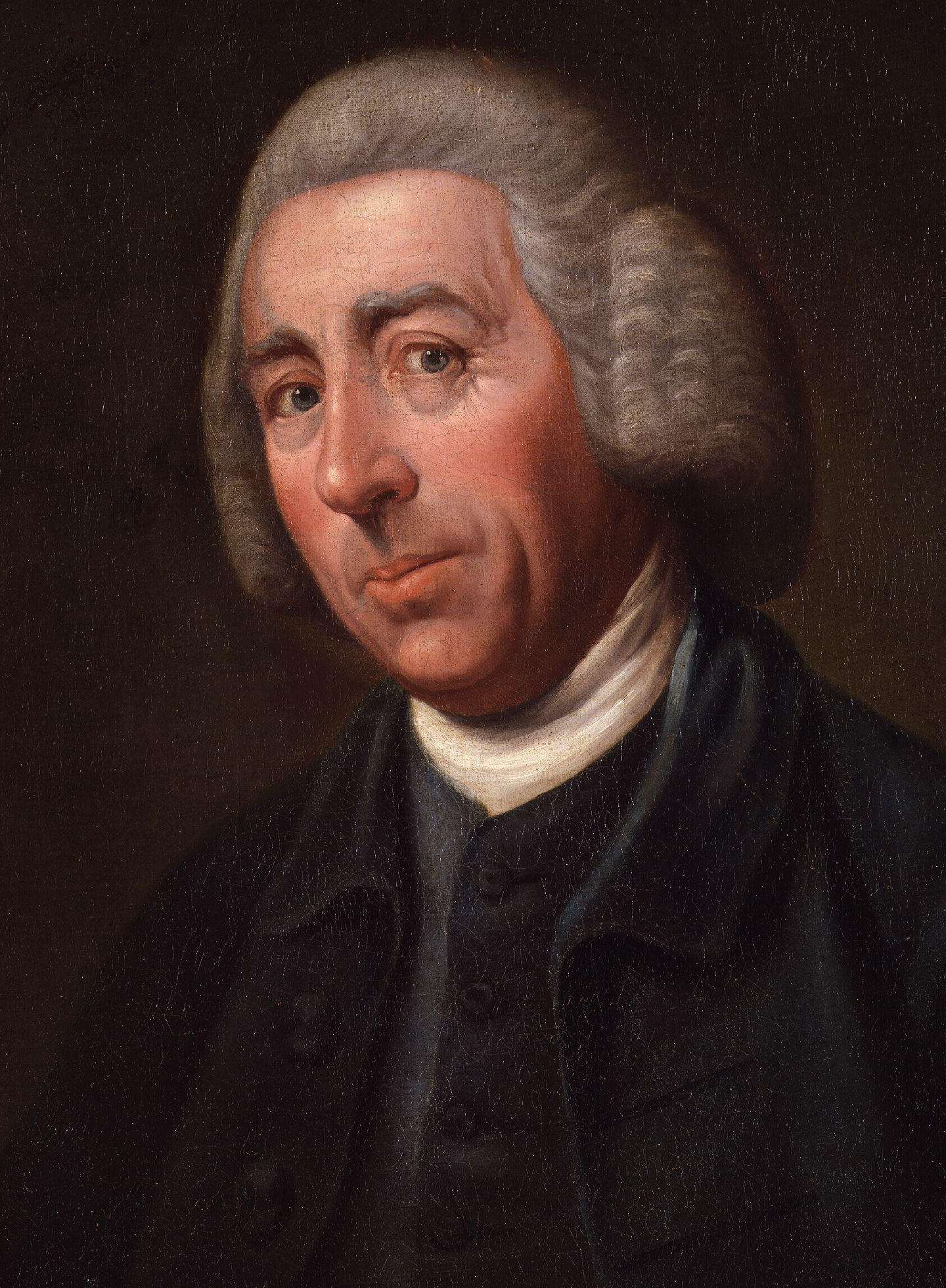
Lancelot ('Capability') Brown, by Nathaniel Dance. Brown worked on the extensive park and on a smaller scale around the priory, c. 1780.

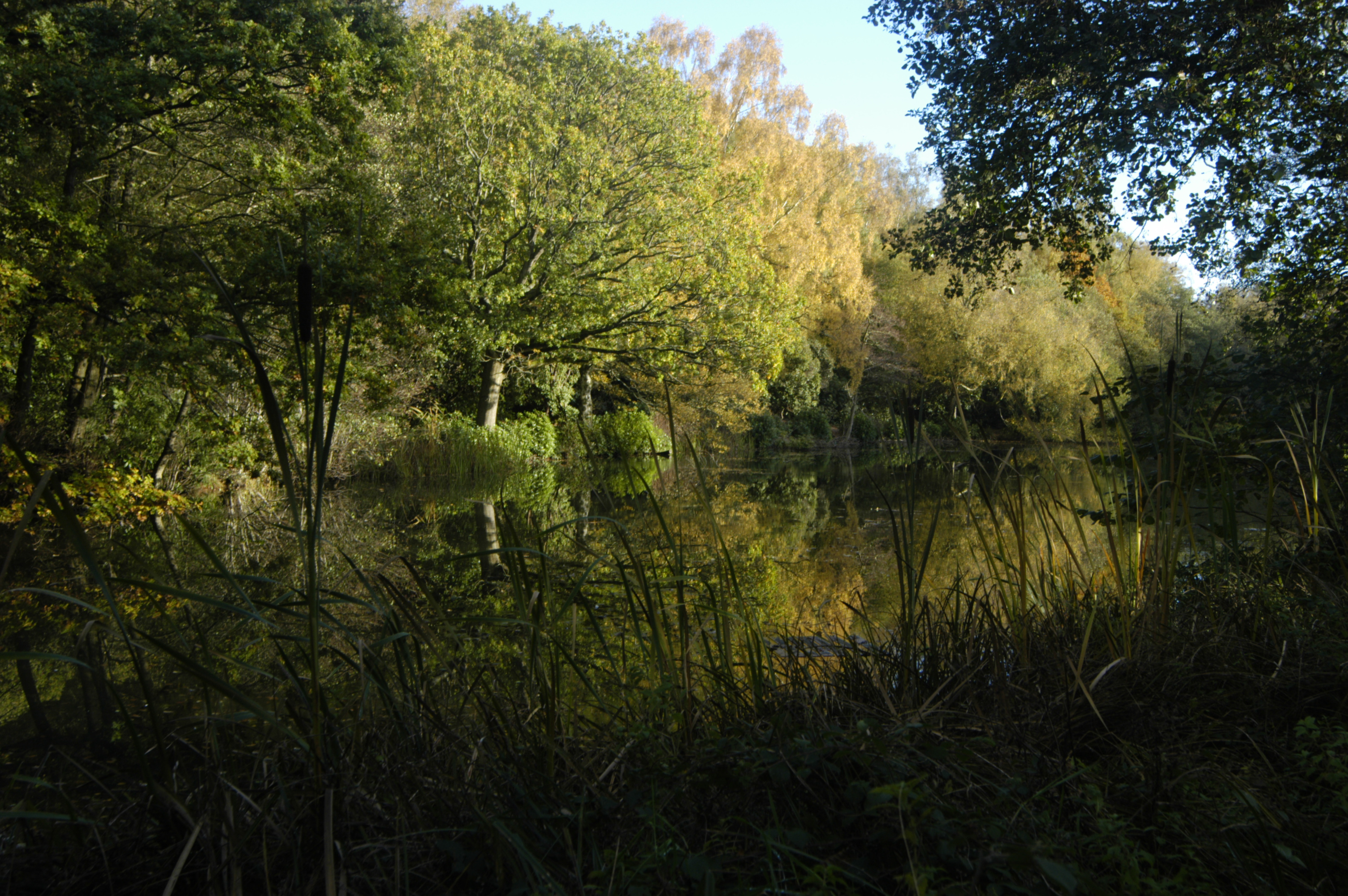
Brown's Pond at Sandleford. Designed by and named after Lancelot Brown.

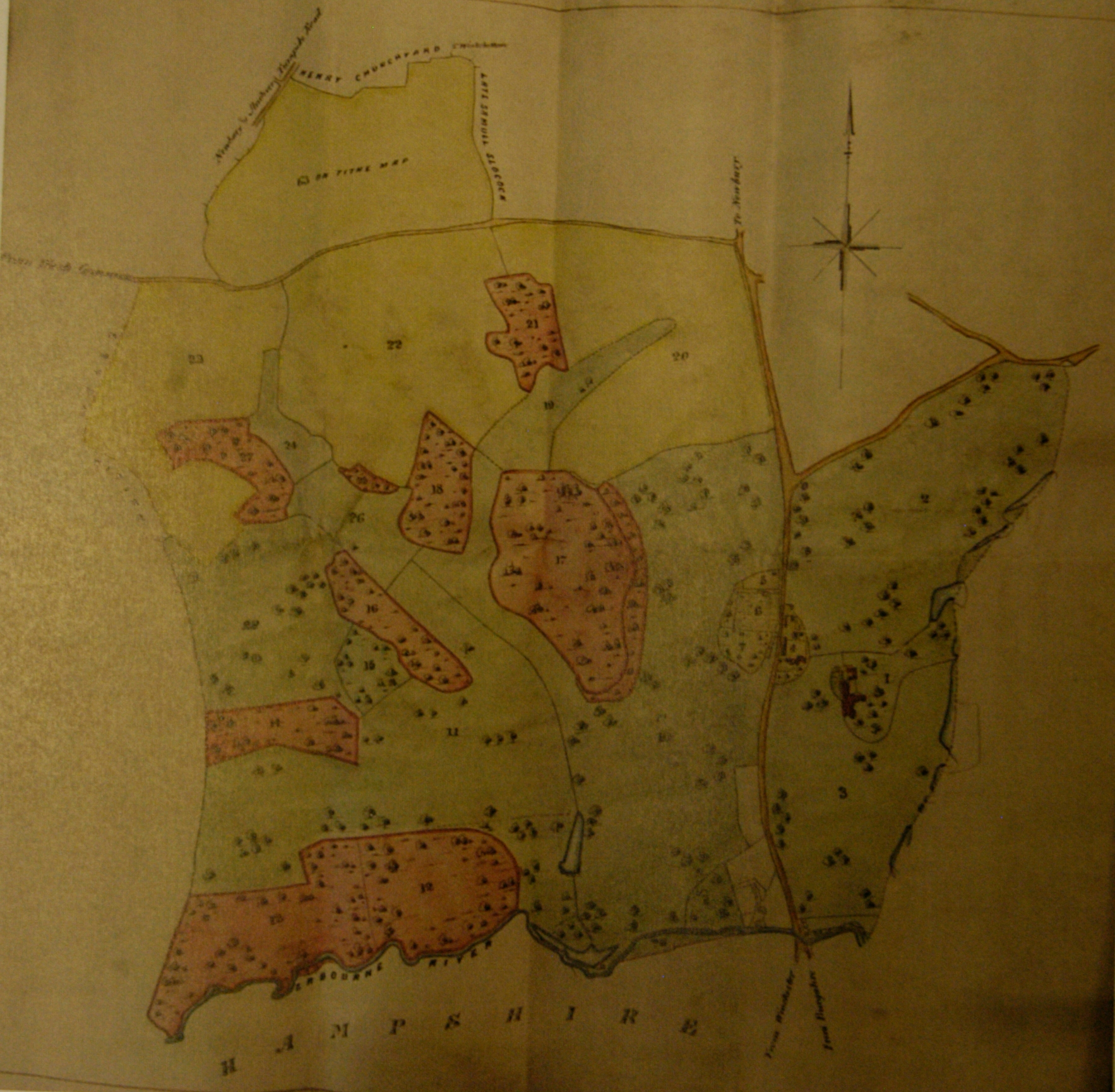
William Chatteris era map of Sandleford, 1871.

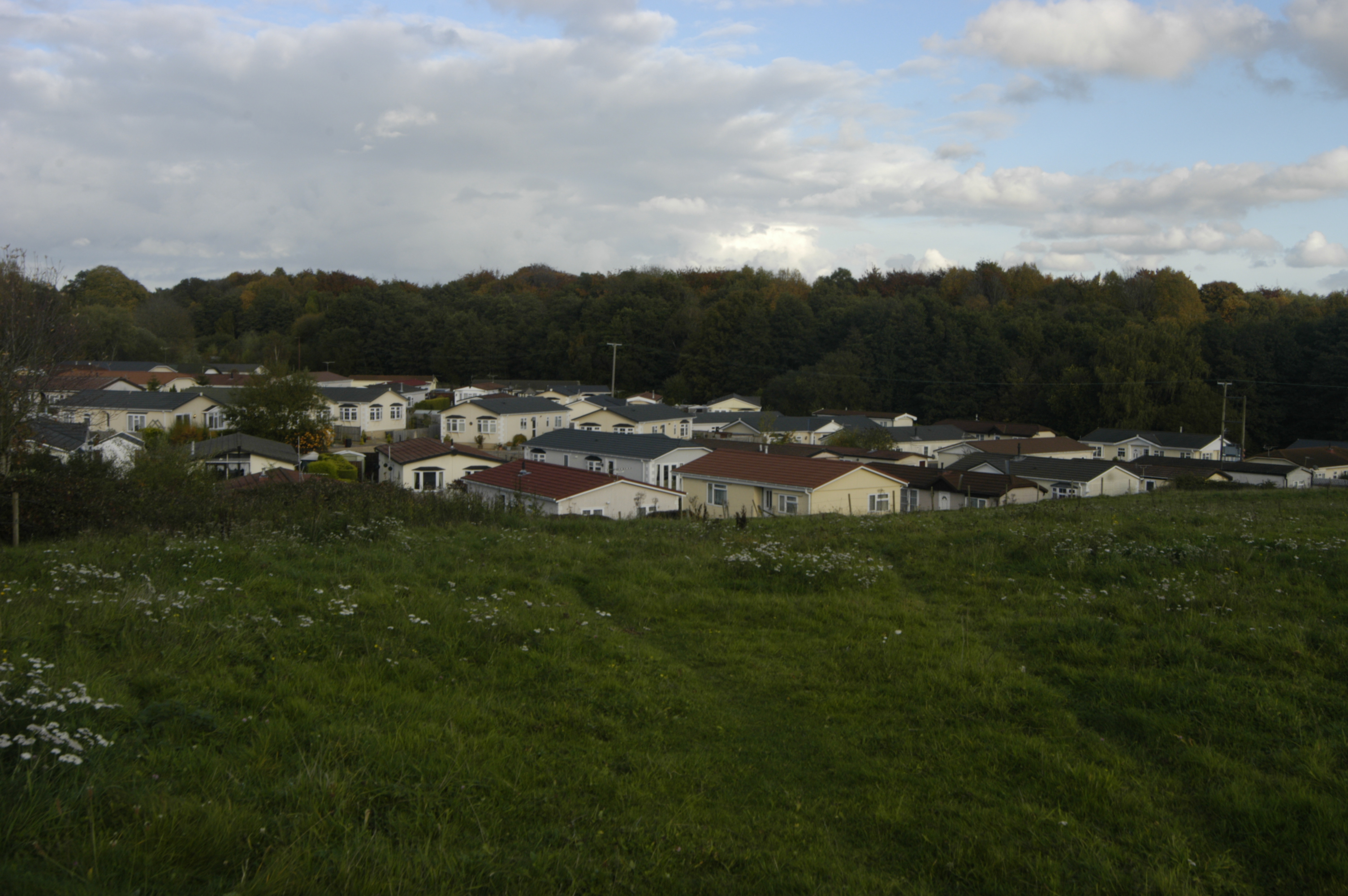
Portacabins at Sandleford, about two furlongs north of the priory.

The priory of Sandleford's foundation diploma or charter (circa 1194) describes in Latin the scope of the site and lands of the priory: 'Geoffrey count of the Perche and Countess Matilda endowed the Augustinian priory of Sandleford (Berkshire) with the church and all the land at Sandleford, together with the wood known as Brademore [Broadmore] and with all the land on both sides of that wood that is, bounded by the watercourse known as Aleburn [river Enborne] from the bridge at Sandleford to the Alburnegate, then by the road which runs from Alburnegate towards Newbury up to the croft of William the huntsman [Wash Common] and on the third side from there along the road [Monks Lane] to the croft of Robert fitz Rembaldand [Robert son of Rembaldi] on the fourth side [A339] up to the bridge at Sandleford. The right to build a mill is granted together with an annual sum of thirteen marks of sterling to be taken from the mills of Newbury every four weeks. When the prior dies one of the remaining canons is to be chosen in his place, 1194–1202.'

A typical lease, this one dated 6 May 1668, granted by the Dean and Canons of Windsor to John Kingsmill of Sandleford, scite of the Priory etc all lately in tenure of Humphrey Fo[r]ster of Aldermaston, in the County of Berks, Bart, and John Harrison of Lincoln's Inn for 21 years at £15 2s. for fishing AND Lease of Sandleford coppices, called Bradmore and Highwood, the first late held by Anthony Childe and the other by Richard Pinfold, and their coppices in the Parish of Migham, in all 68 acres, by the Dean and Canons of Windsor to John Kingsmill of Sandelford, esquire.

Another later but similar lease of the estate, this one dated 31 August 1737, between Edward Montagu and the Dean and Canons of Windsor in summary read: Lease of the scite of the Priory, the farm of Sandelford [Sandleford], and Tydhams [Tydehams] and all messuages, tenements in Sandelford and Midgham, Berks, in Burrowghcleere [Burghclere] and Sidmanton [Sydmonton], in the county of Hants, the meadow called Milmead on the South side of Aborn Streame [River Enborne], (except woods and the tenement which John Dean occupies in Sandelford near Abornstream and an acre of land on its north side, and Waterleaze and a piece of Sandelford green 3 acres and certain rights of fishing in Aborn stream) – and also fishing in the river Kennett in the parishes Limborn [Lambourn], Enborne and Nubery [Newbury], by the Dean and Canons of Windsor to Edward Mountague of London, esquire.

If approached and seen from the south, from the Newtown Common or Whitchurch road, the distant prospect of Sandleford, with steep, magnificent and south facing parkland and wooded slopes with the priory itself sitting atop, high, the effect would have been like that of Camelot or Shangdu. The Xandu of Samuel Purchas, as in his 1614 description based on what Marco Polo had reported: In Xandu did Cublai Can build a stately Pallace, encompassing sixteen miles of plaine ground with a wall, wherein are fertile Meddowes, pleasant Springs, delightfull streames, and all sorts of beasts of chase and game, and in the middest thereof a sumpuous house of pleasure, which may be moved from place to place.

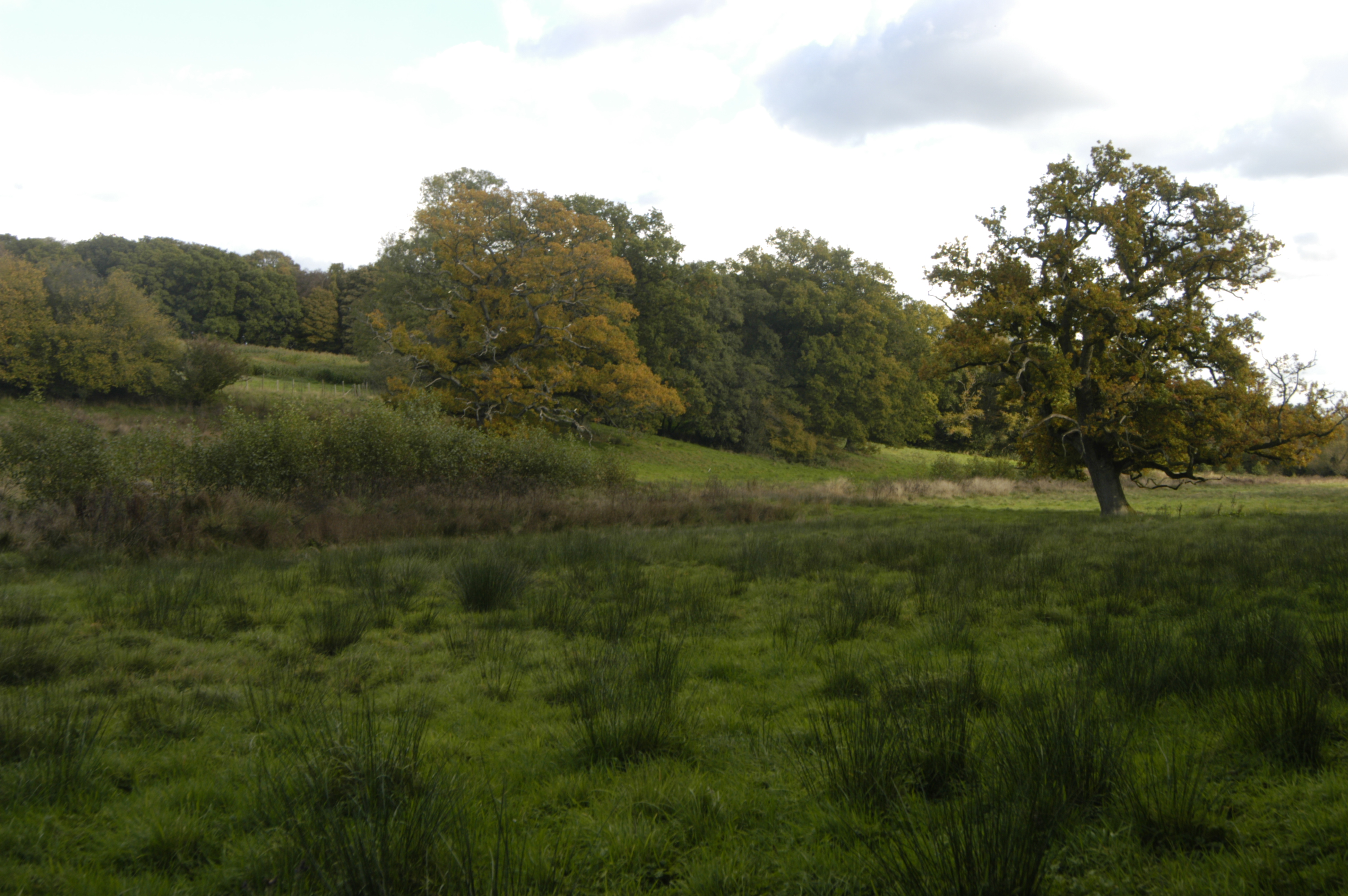
North of Barn copse, Looking north-easterly towards Slockett's Copse.

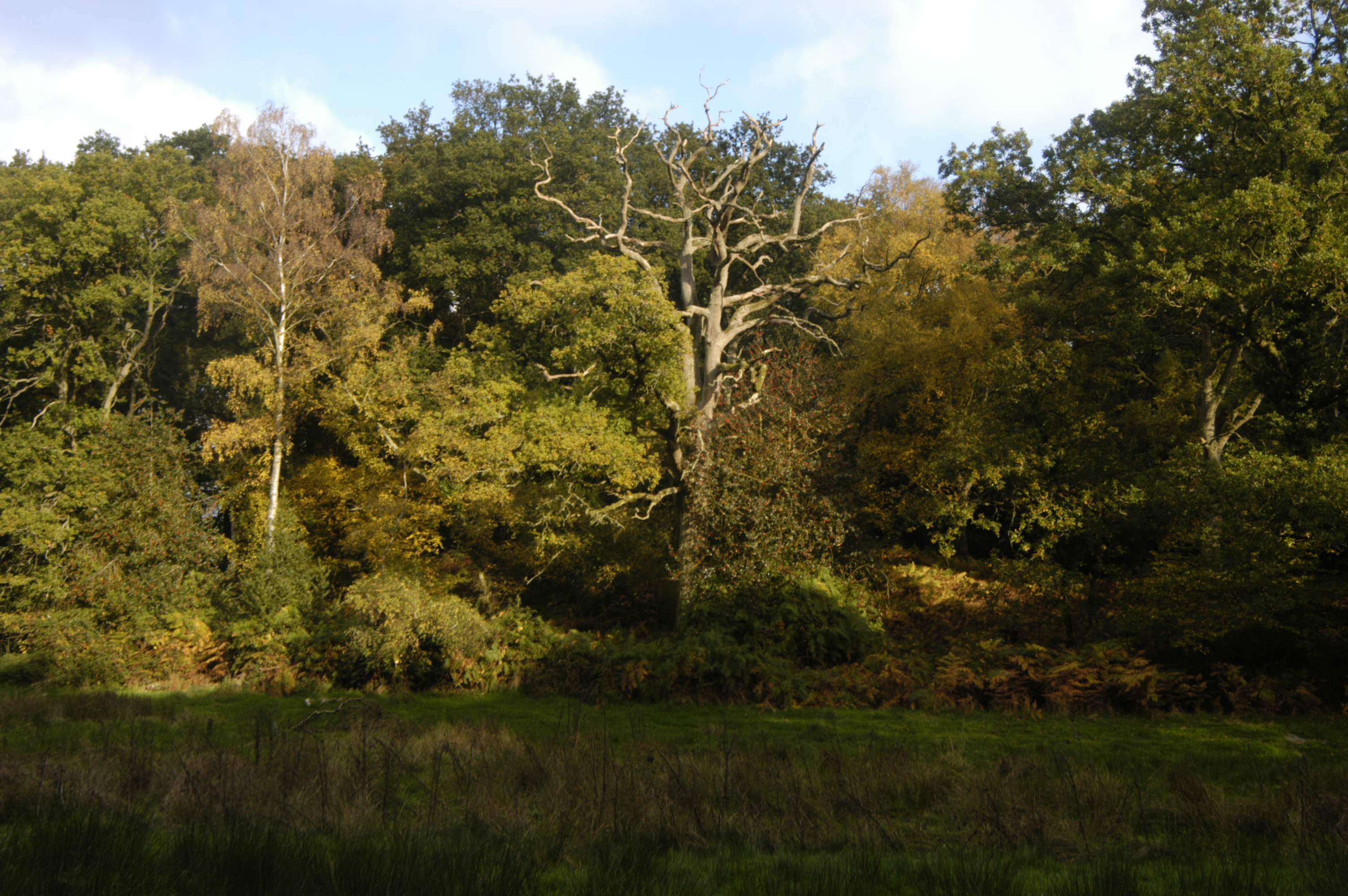
Looking east across a water meadow, from Slockett's Copse to High Wood.

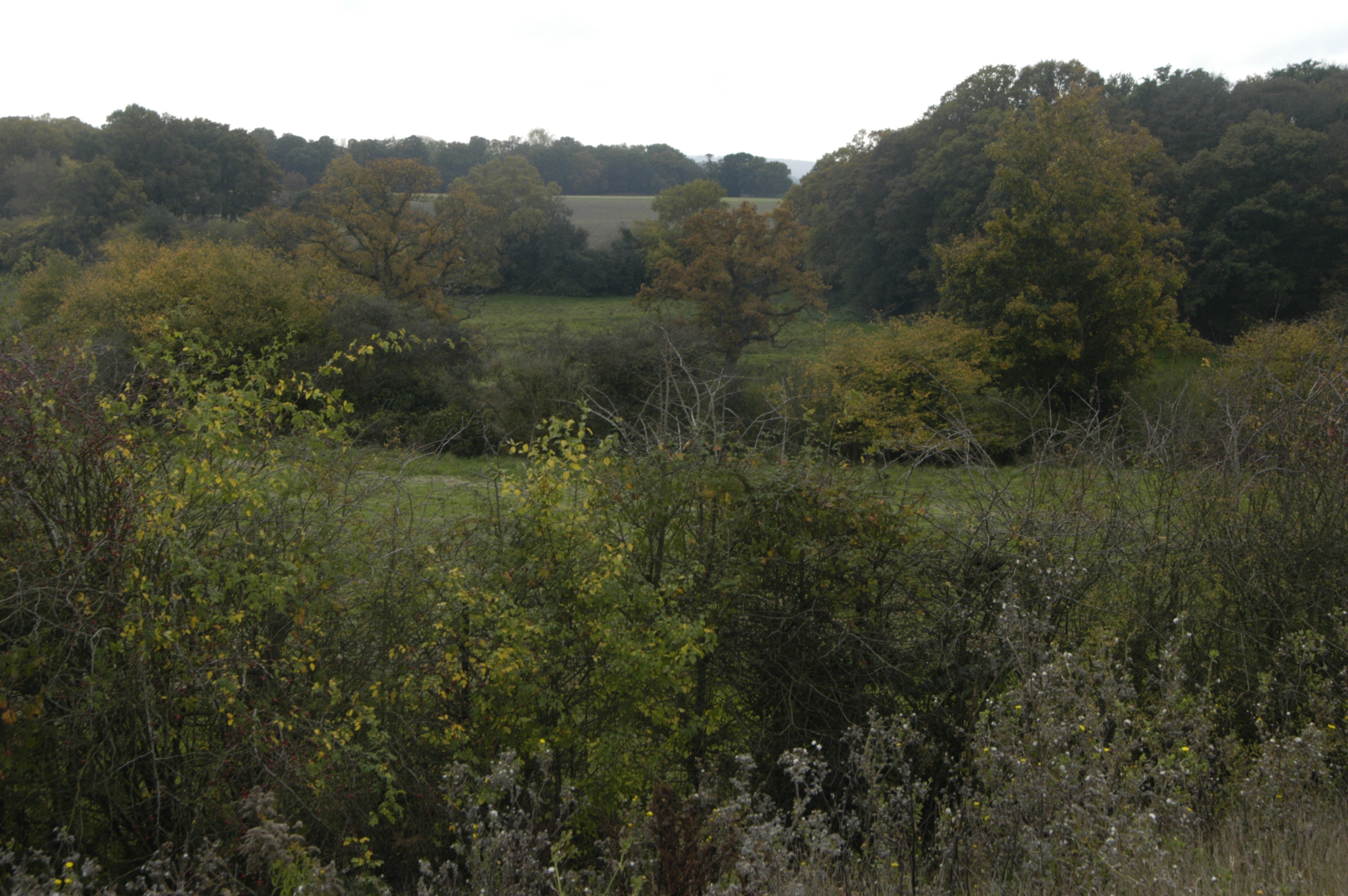
View south over water meadows towards Barn Copse and the edge of Dirty Ground Copse, with Gorse Covert beyond.

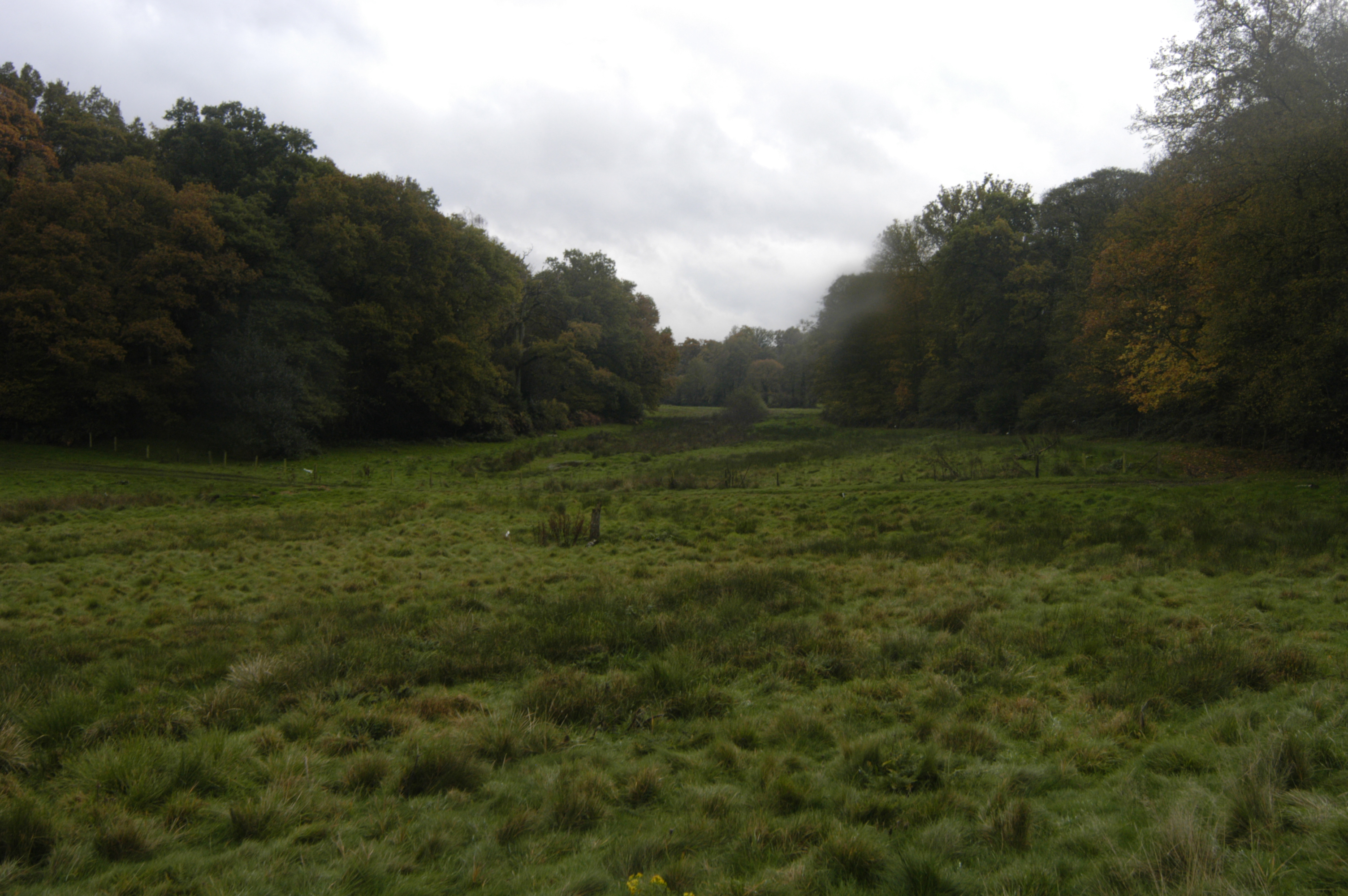
Looking south from Crook's Copse towards Dirty Ground Copse, between High Wood, on the left, and Slockett's Copse, on the right.

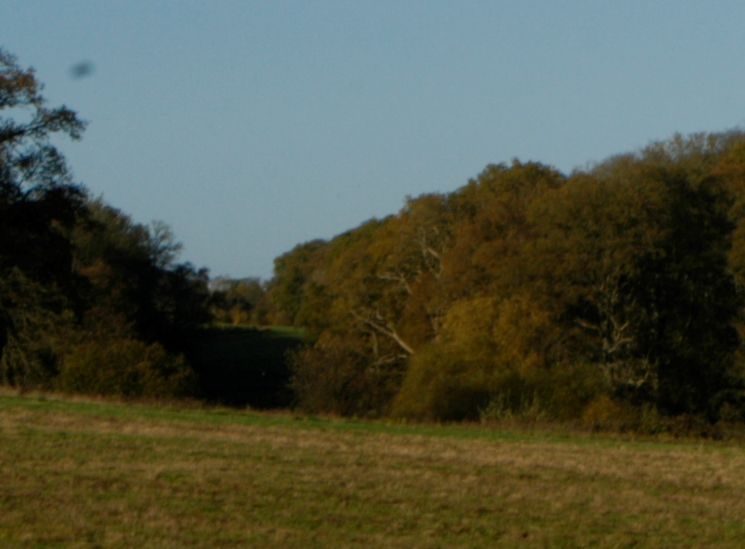
Vista looking north towards Crook's Copse, from the track, with Slockett's Copse on the left, and High Wood on the right.

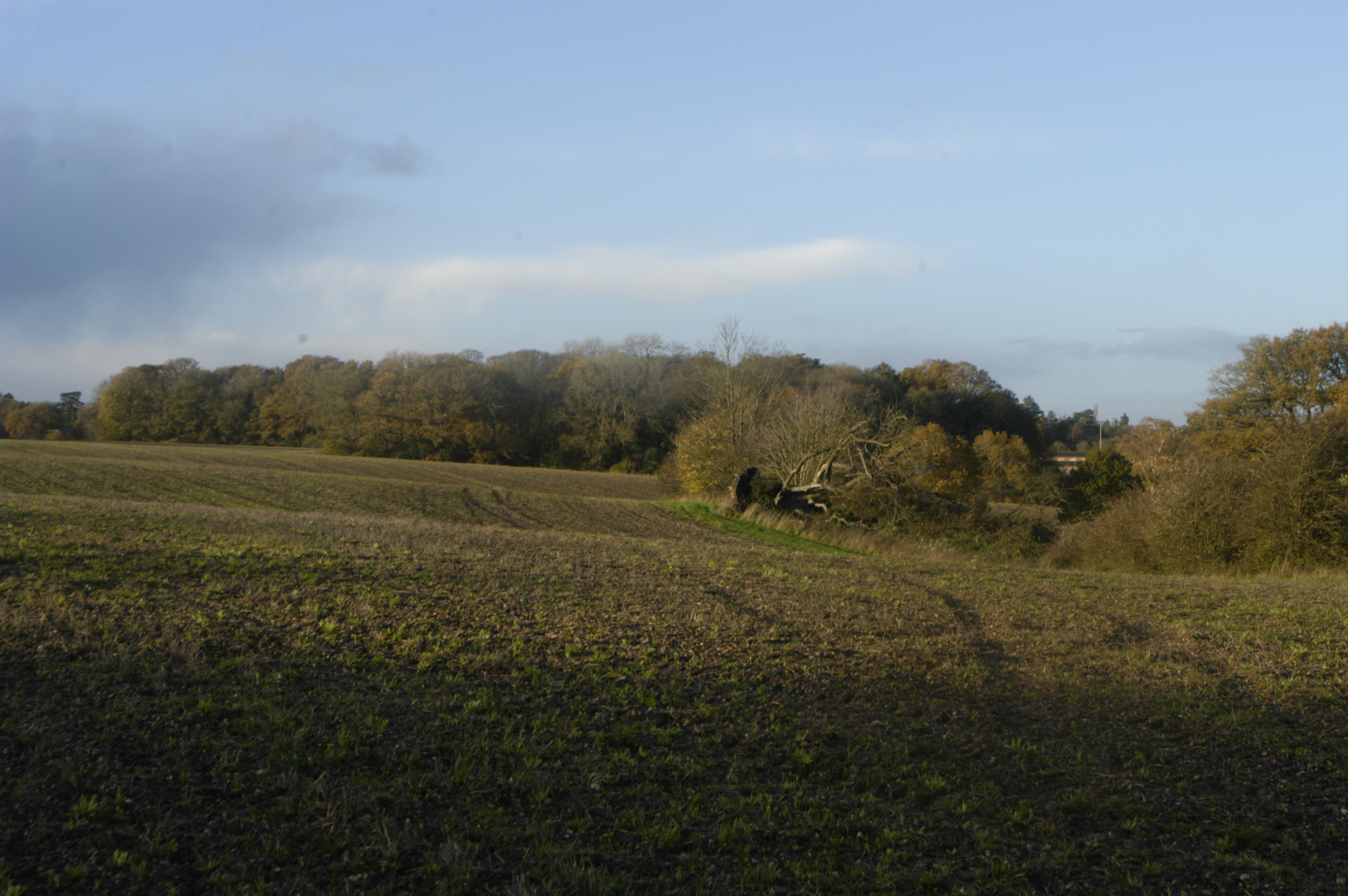
Looking west-north-west towards Barn Copse, from the track, near Gorse Copse.

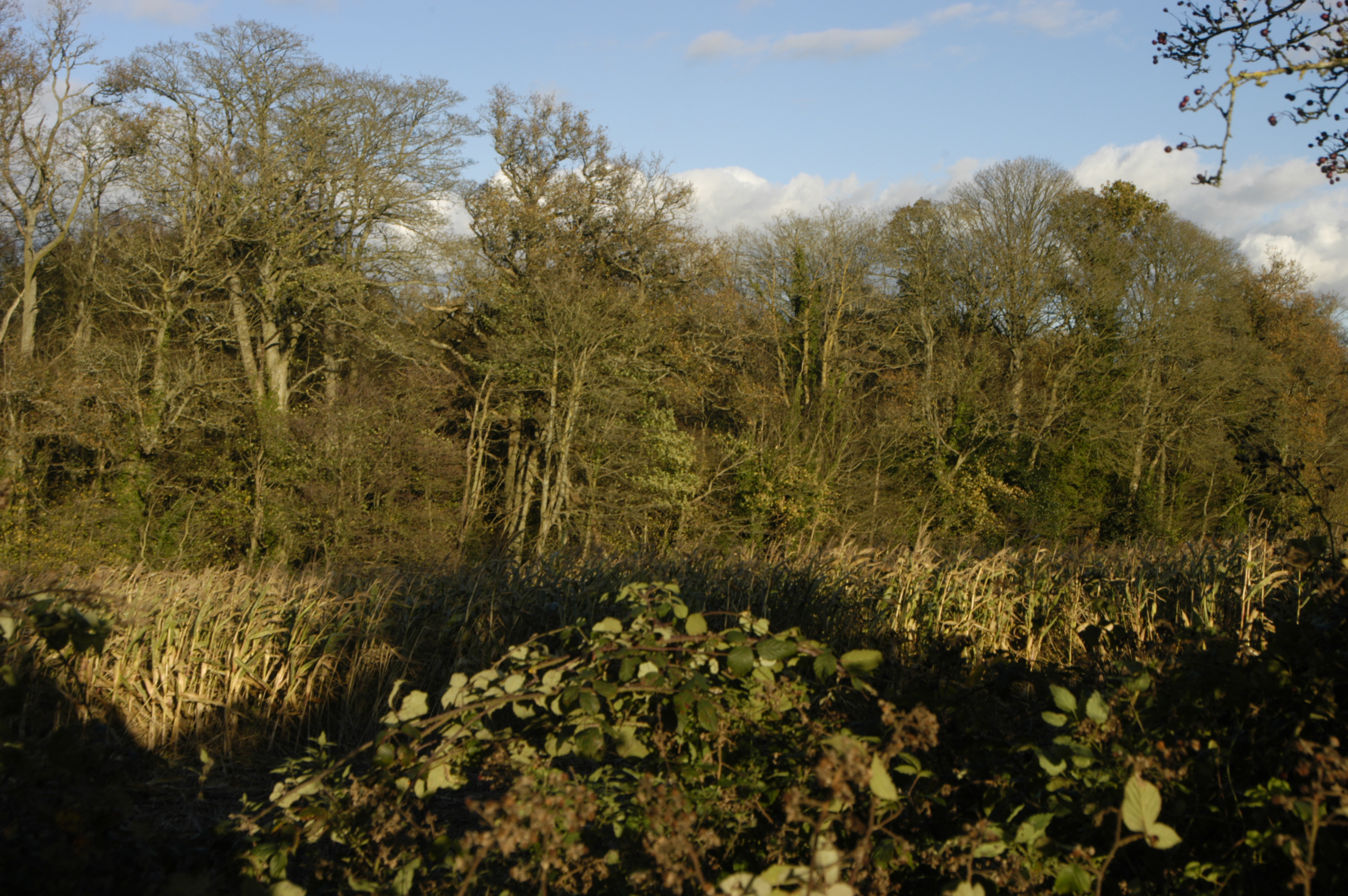
Dirty Ground Copse, from the south.

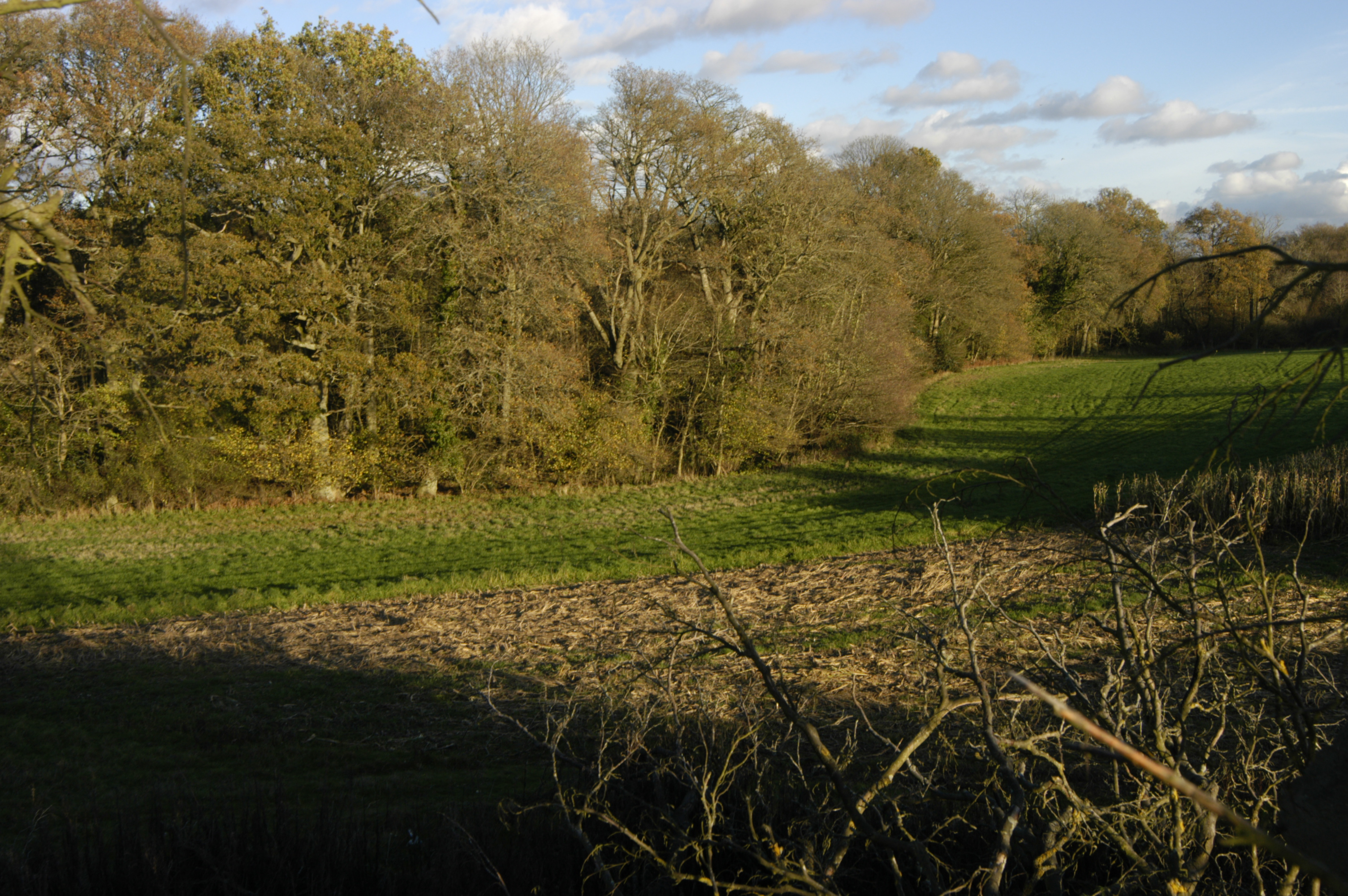
Dirty Ground Copse, and a field, from the south.

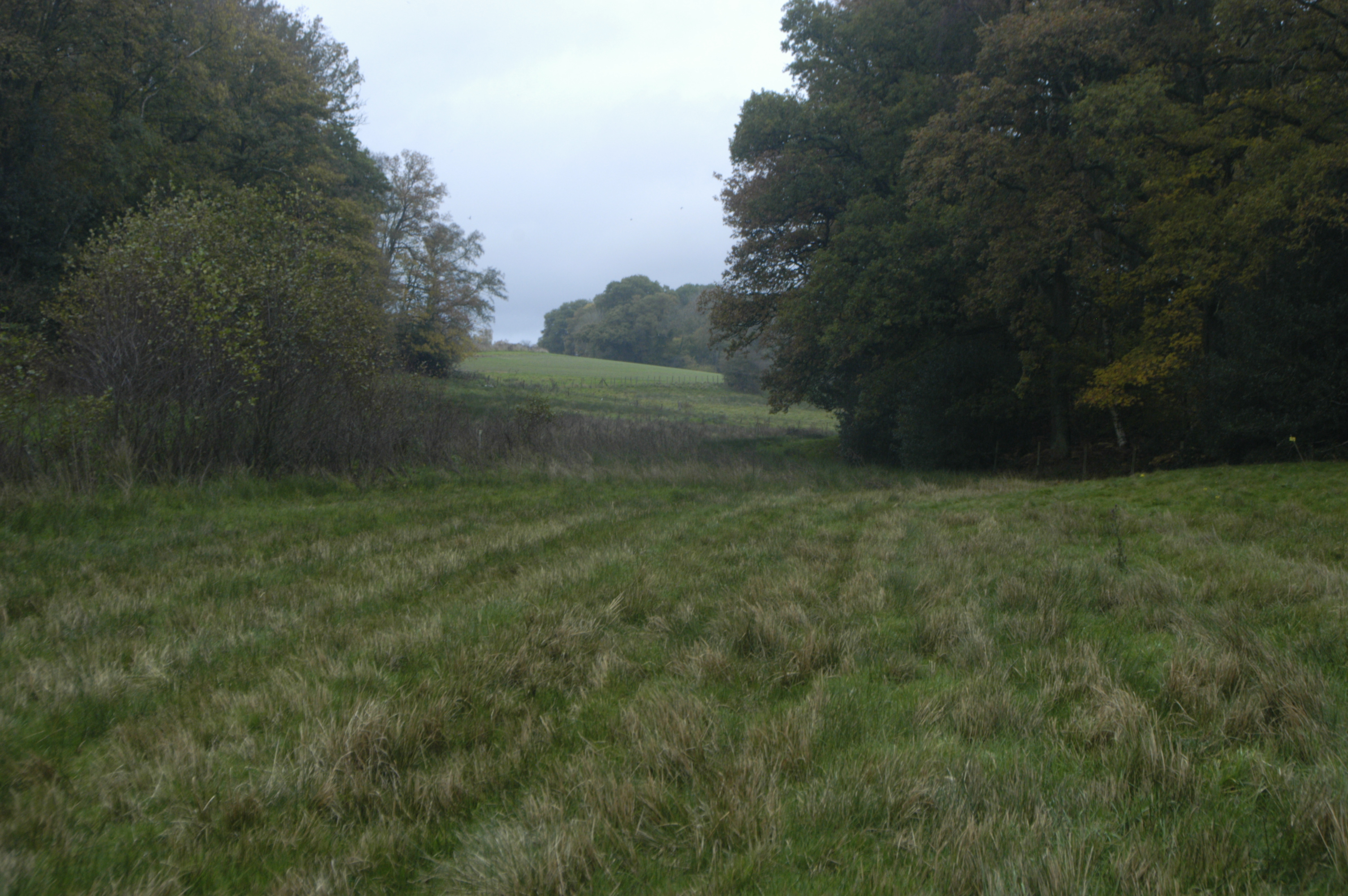
Looking north towards Crook's Copse, between High Wood, on the right, and Slockett's Copse, on the left.

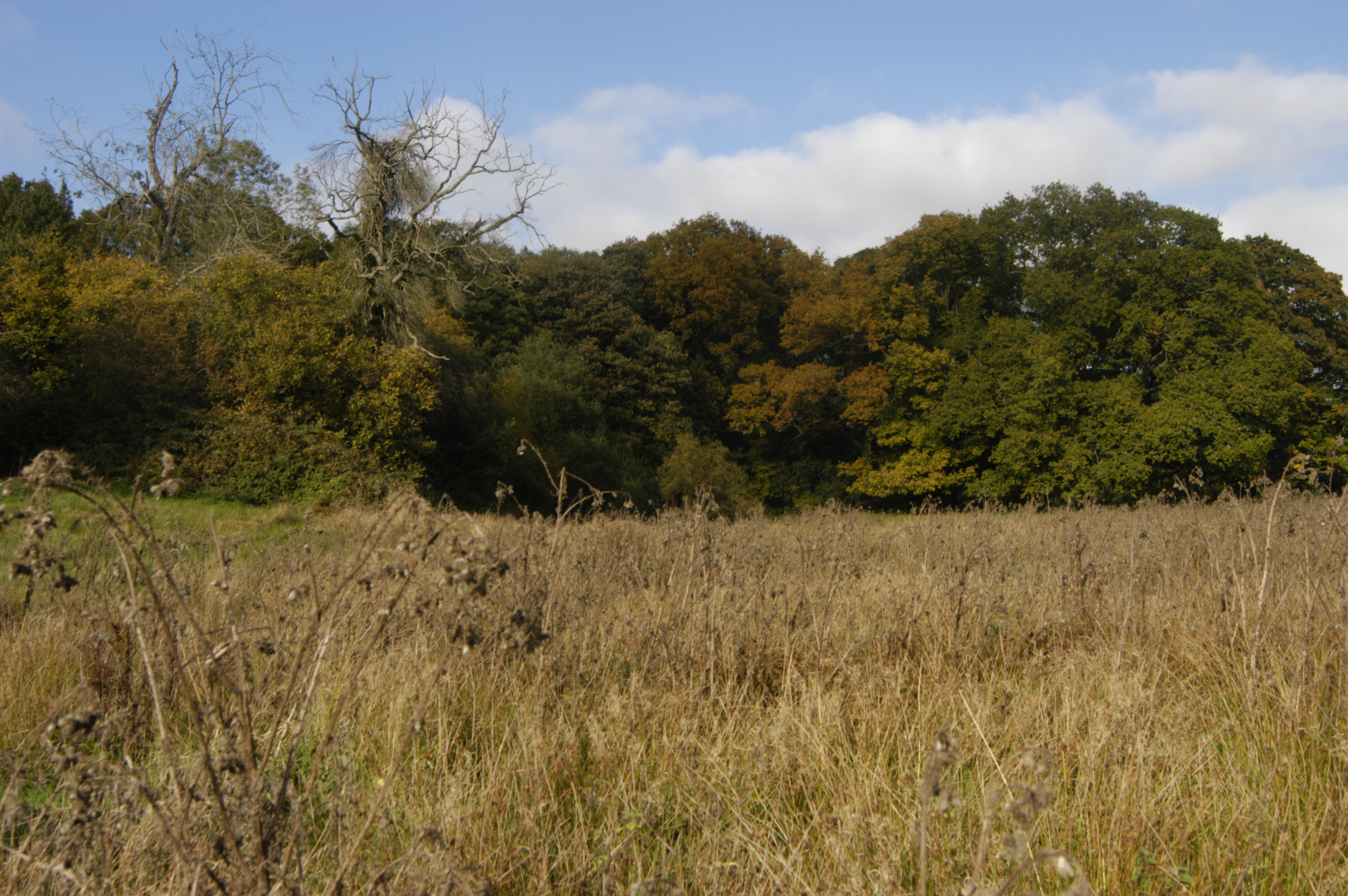
Southern edge of Crook's Copse from the northern fringe of High Wood.

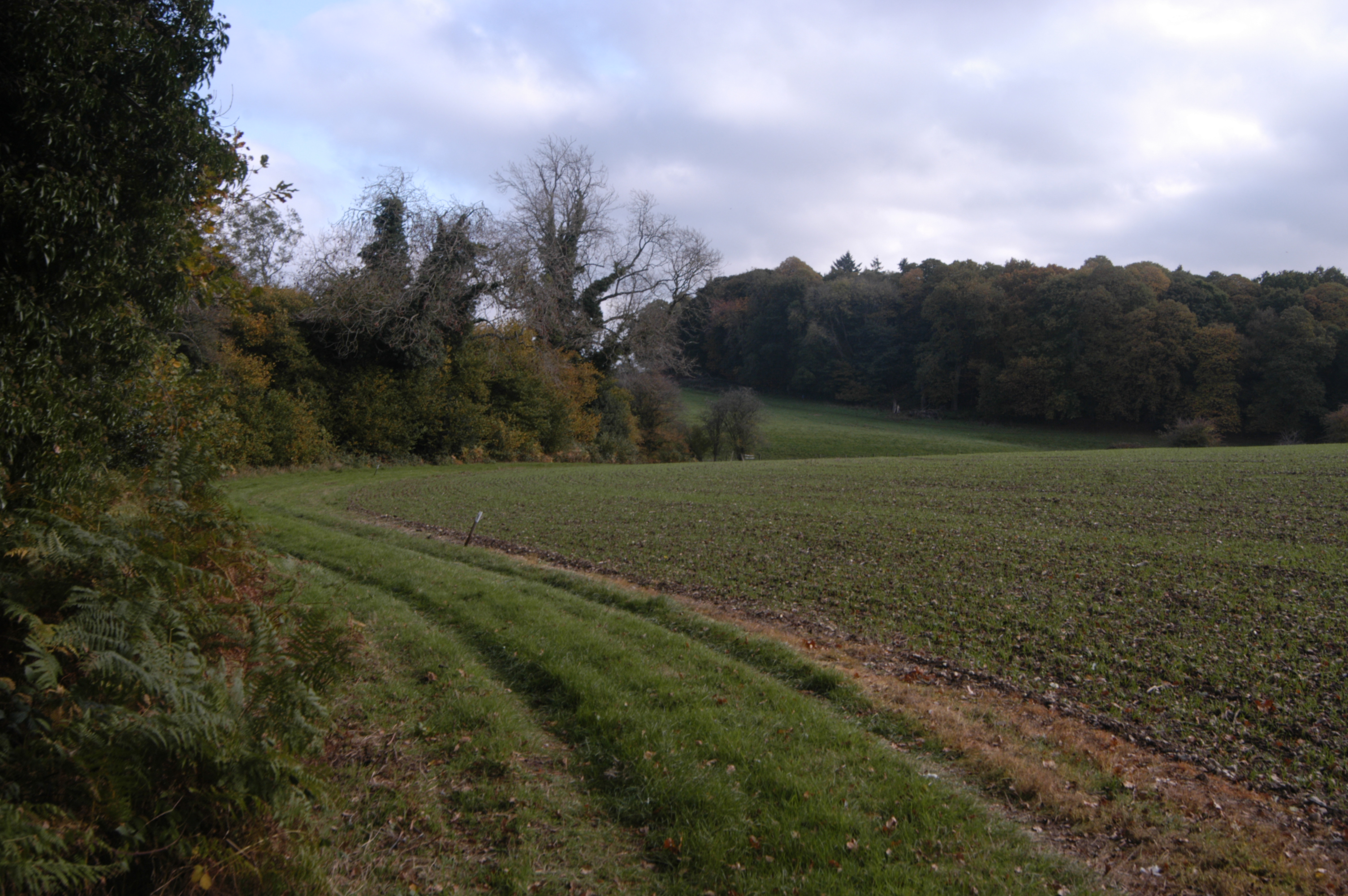
Looking south from west edge of Crook's Copse to north fringe of High Wood.

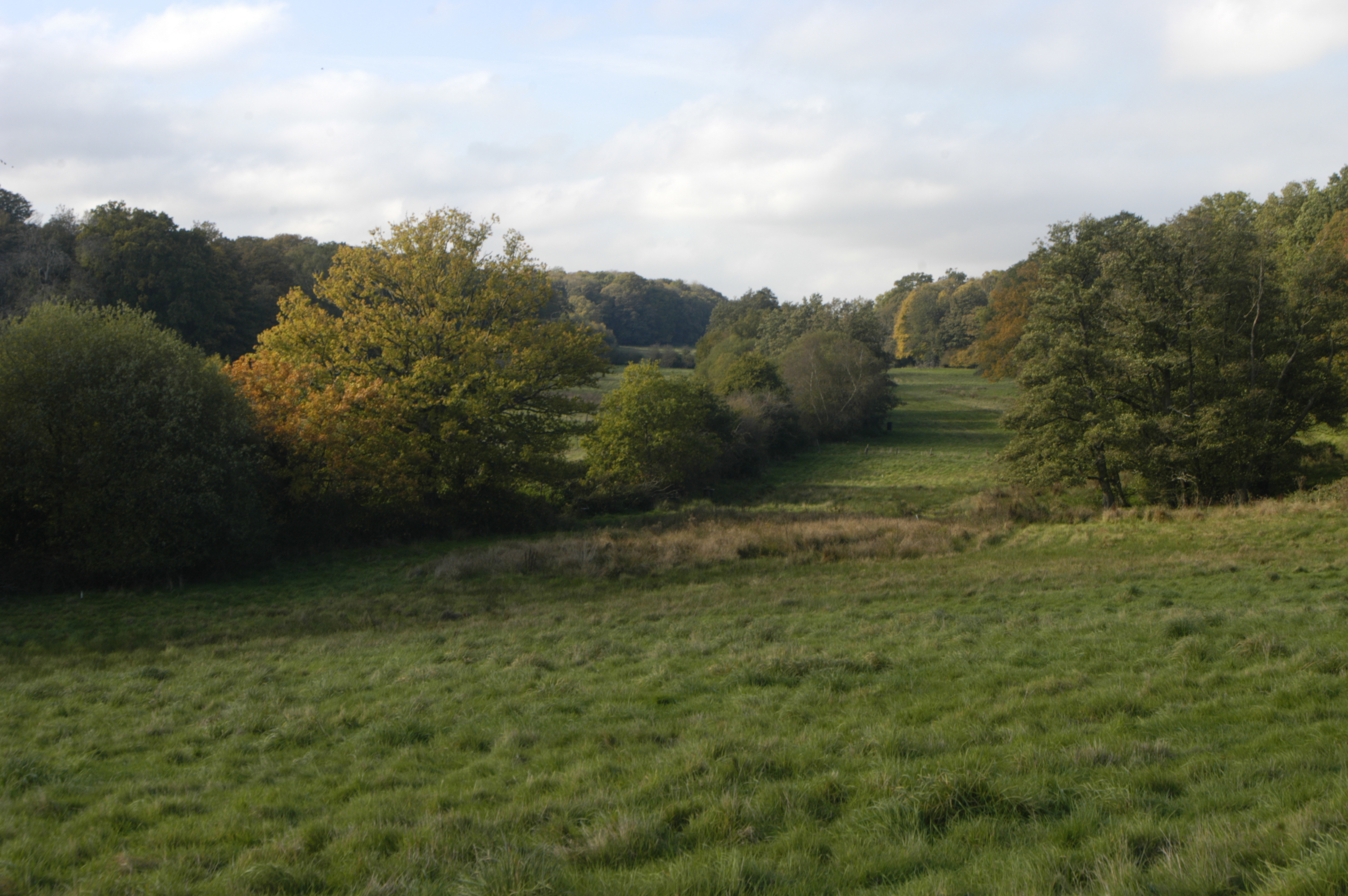
Looking west- north-west towards and over water meadows, with High Wood and Slockett's Copse on the right and Dirty Ground Copse on the left.

The parish of Sandleford is, as mentioned above, about 500 acres, most of which is an arcadian farm and woodland that lies to the west of the priory/school. This almost square block is bounded by the River Enborne to the south; on the west by a hedge line that runs two furlongs to the east of the Andover Road (A343) which runs north-south through Wash Common; Monks (Monkey) Lane and therefore Newbury to the north (though the parish boundary runs a bit south of the road); and the Newtown road, A339 (previously A34) to the east (though clearly parish boundary and the priory/school is to the east of that).

Almost the only way into this park is from the west, from the A343, Andover road, past the Roman Catholic church at Warren Lodge, and down the remaining 200 yards of an ancient track flanked by field maple, oak, ash, hazel, ivy, elm, elder, hawthorn, and blackthorn. Around here the cavalry of Prince Rupert of the Rhine lined up before the First Battle of Newbury in September 1643, and near here are the meadows which feature in the beginning of Richard Adams' semi-factual novel Watership Down. At this point the enclosed track ends at the Newbury (Wash Common)/Sandleford parish boundary, but the public footpath or former carriage track continues. In previous centuries, in Mrs. Montagu's day, this was the main route to the priory from the west, from places like Bath, Somerset. Here the view quickly opens out, expansively, perspective tricks have been played with hedge and wood edge lines which add to the sense of infinity and space.

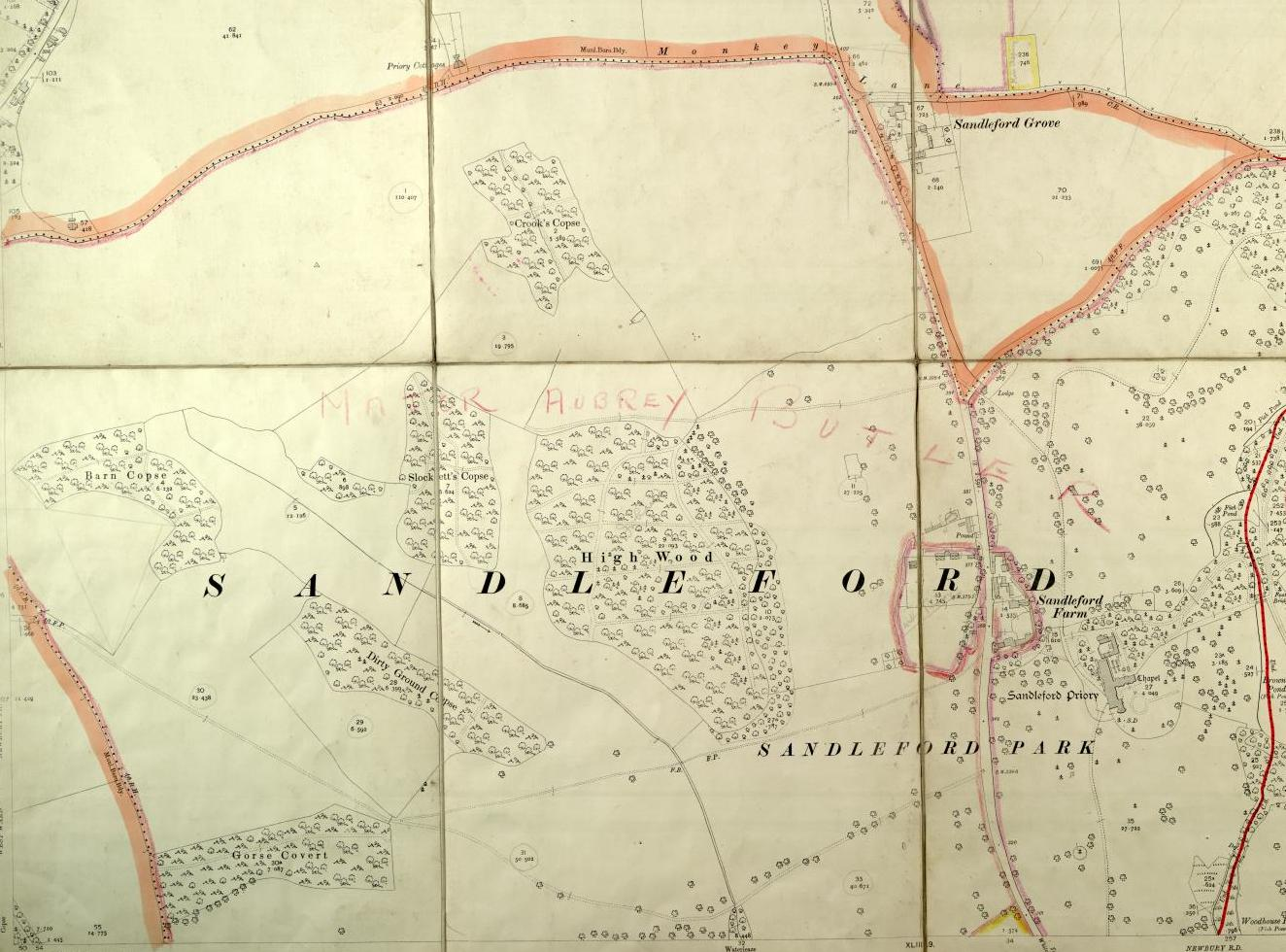
1911 Ordnance Survey map of Sandleford.

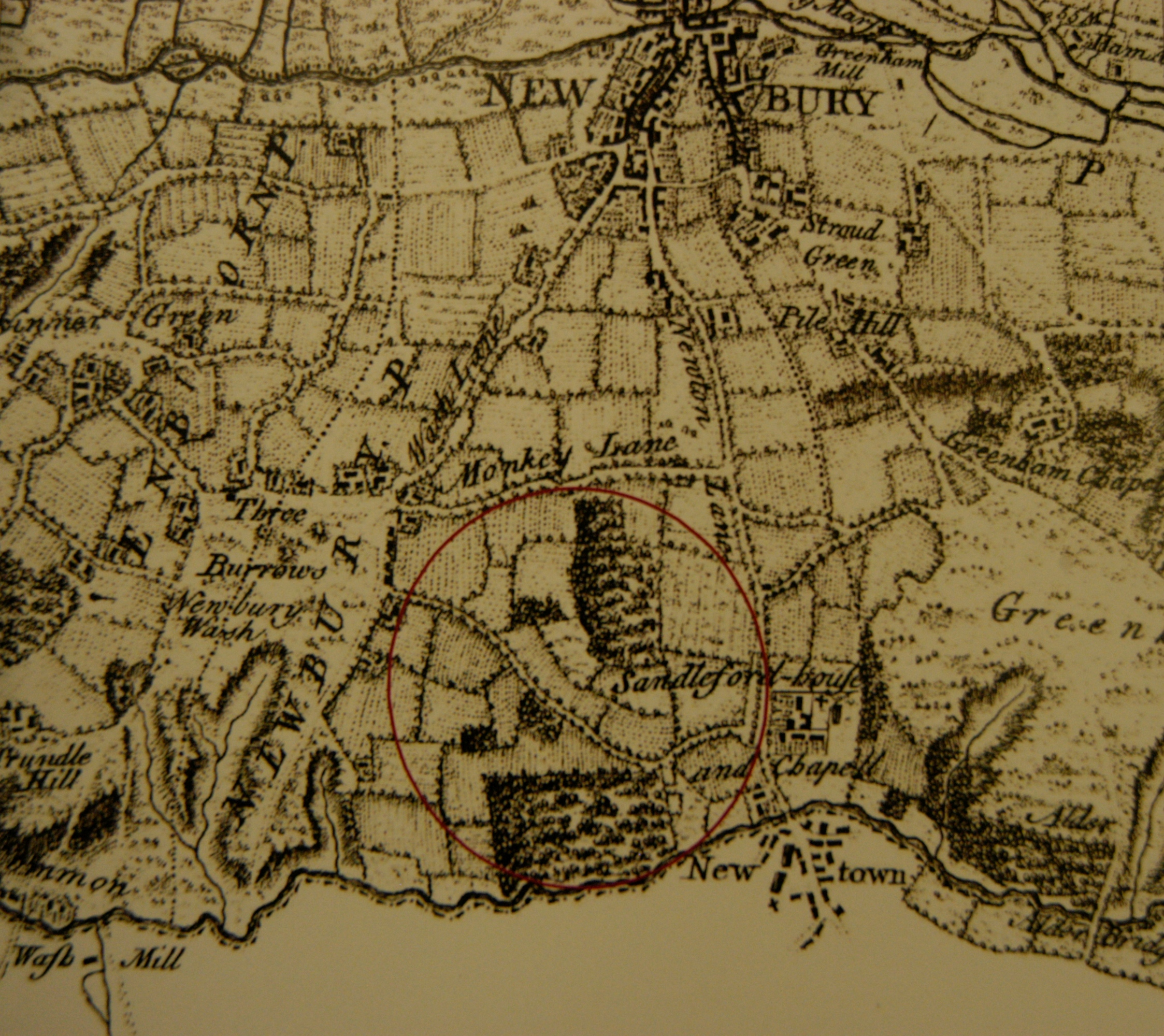
Sandleford, as seen on John Rocque's map of Berkshire, 1761.

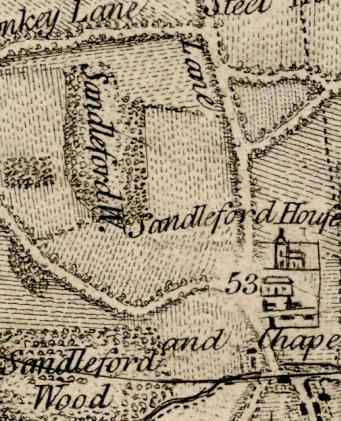
John Willis map of Sandleford, 1768, which was based on Rocque's.

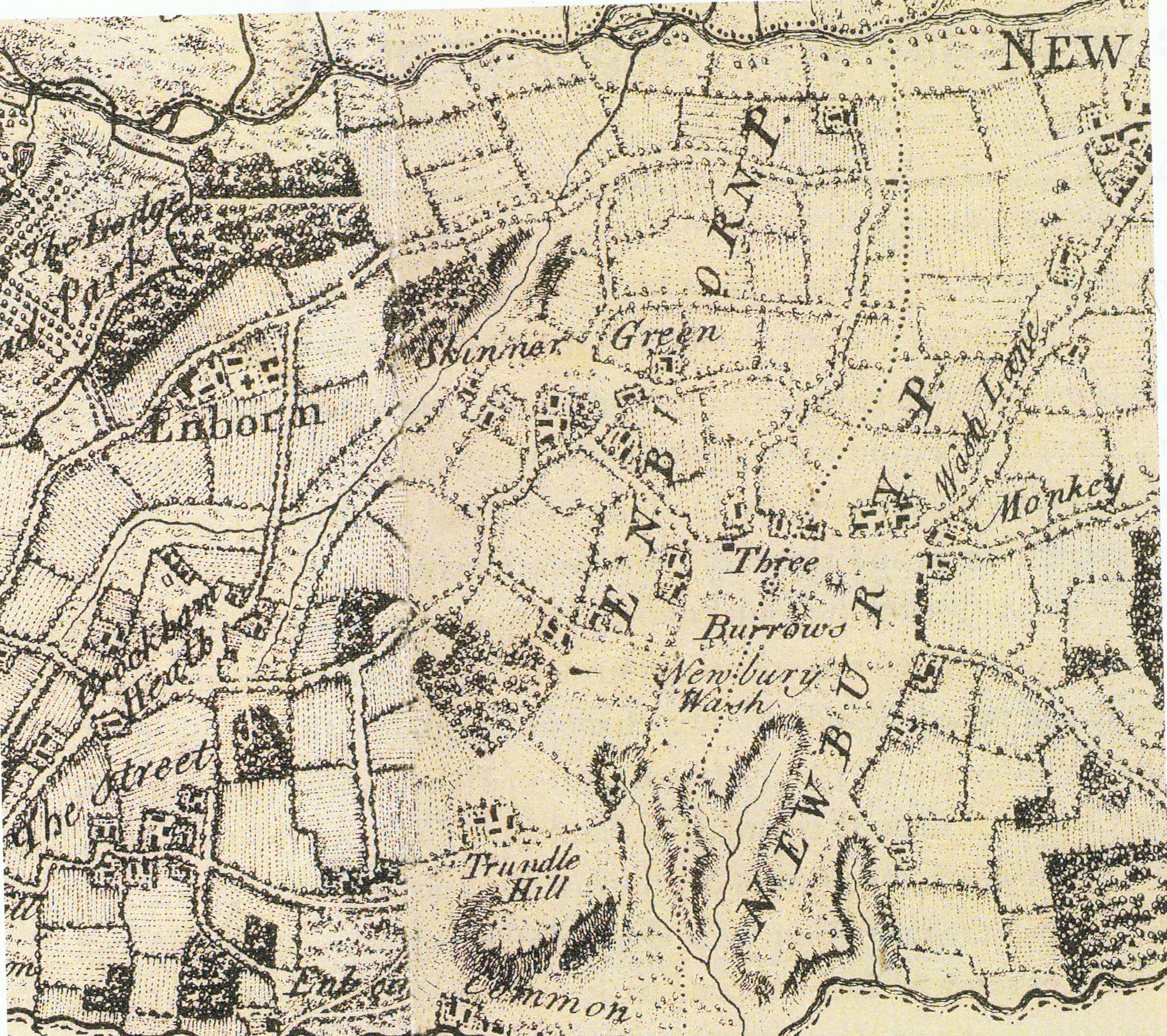
Sandleford; Newbury Wash; Enborne Wash; and East Enborne, from John Rocque's map, 1761.

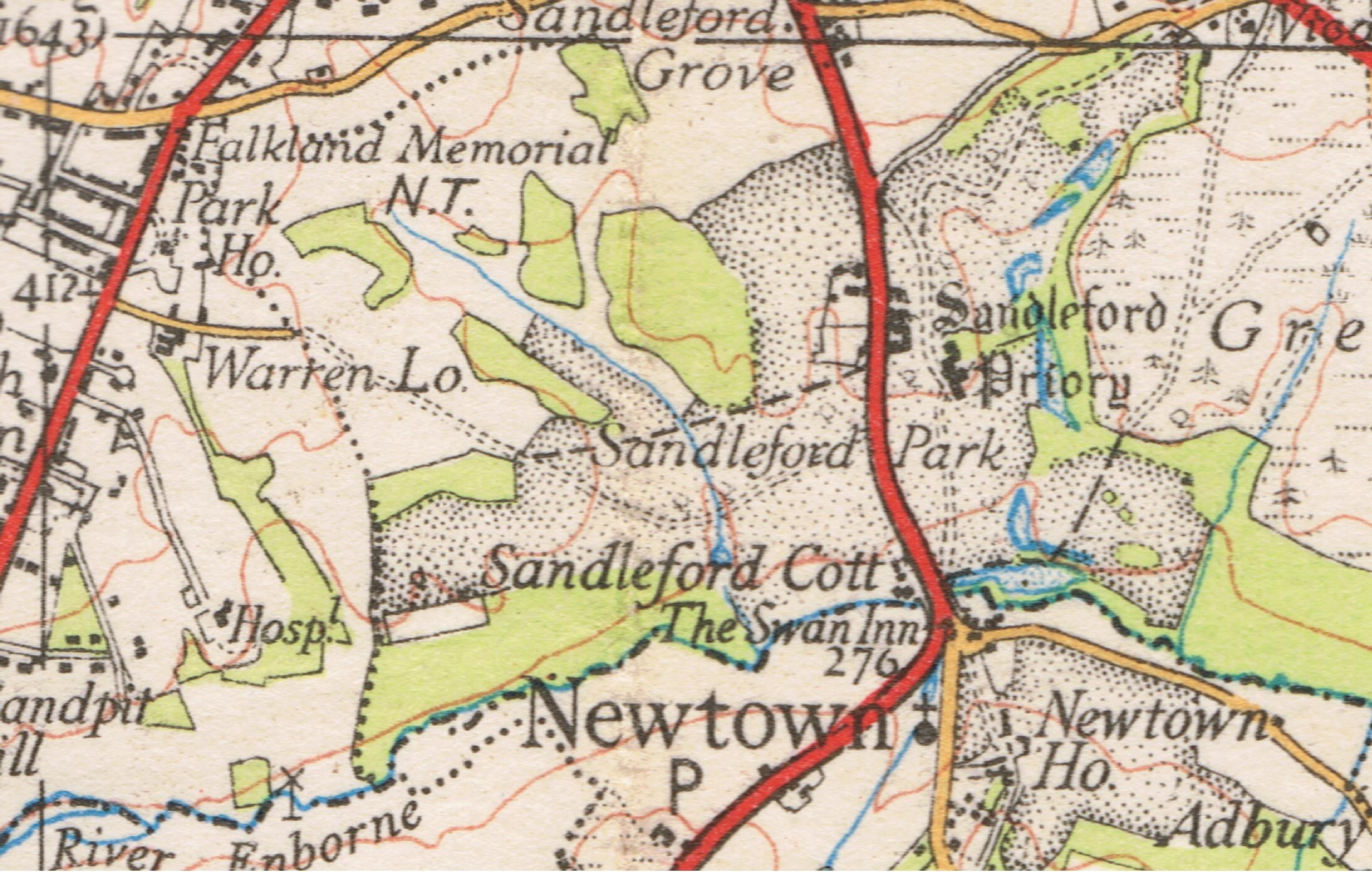
Ordnance survey map, 1939, detail.

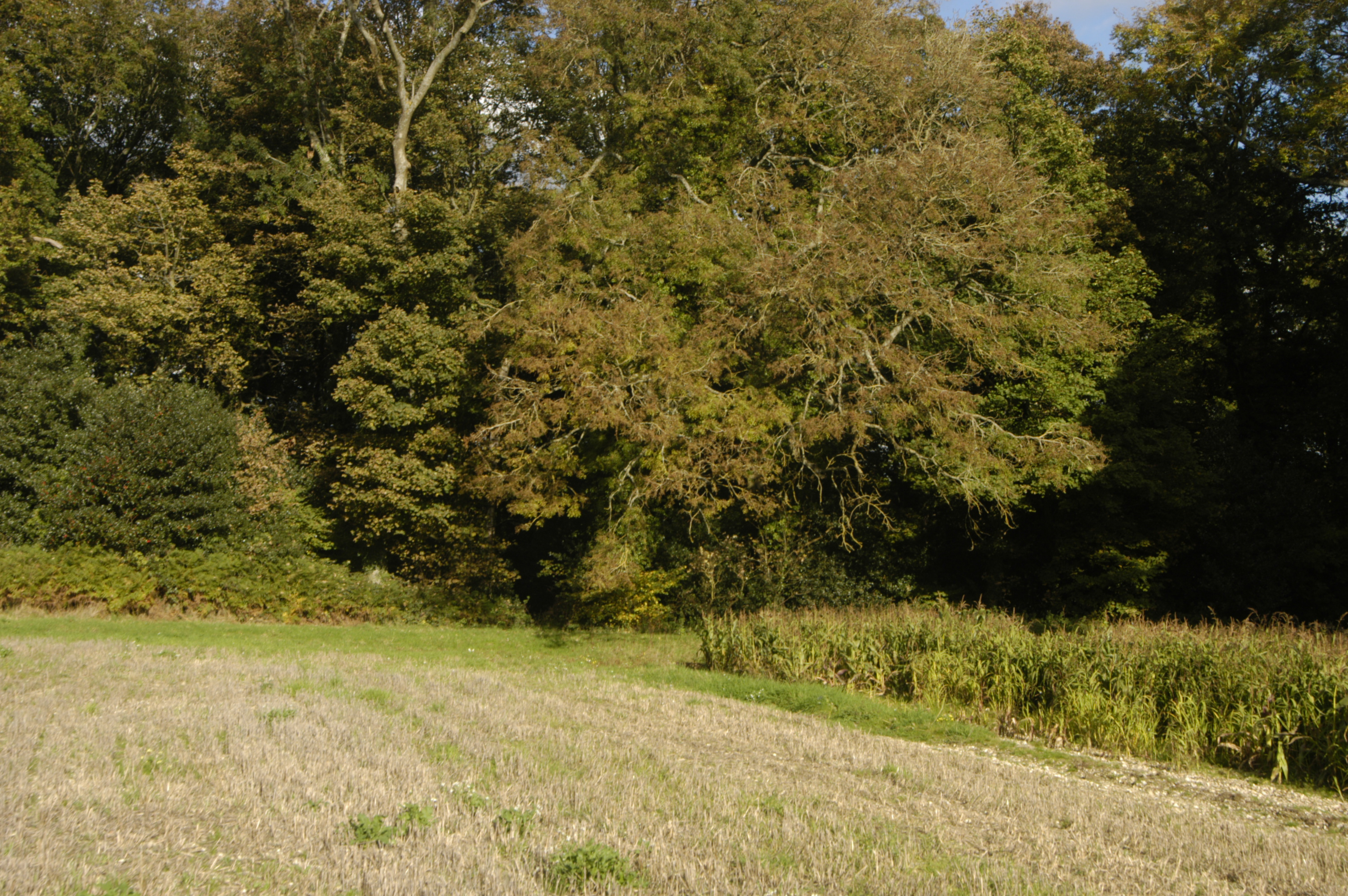
An exterior corner of Barn Copse, showing a game crop.

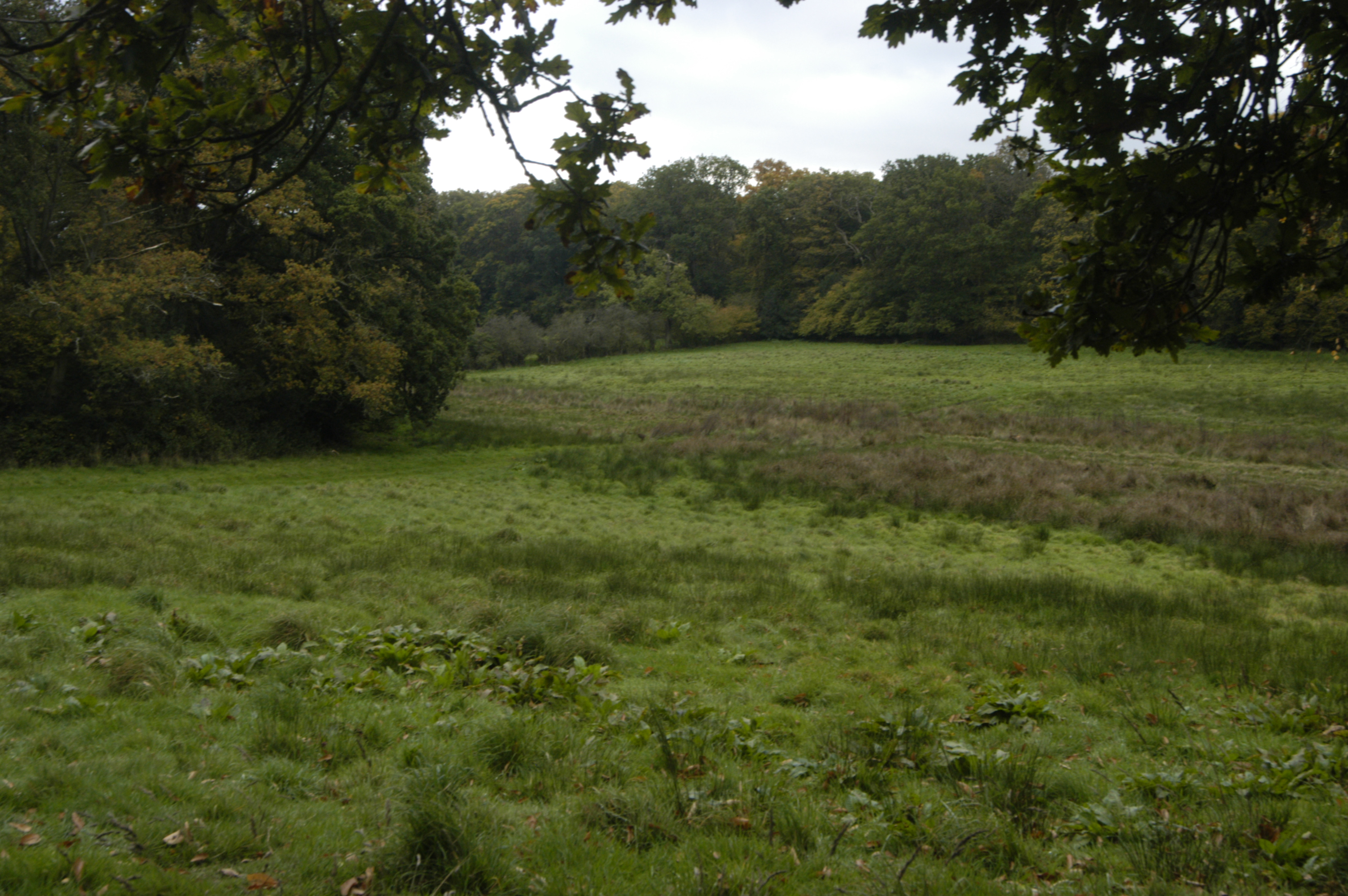
Water meadows, looking east-south east towards, on the left, Slockett's Copse, and Dirty Ground Copse.

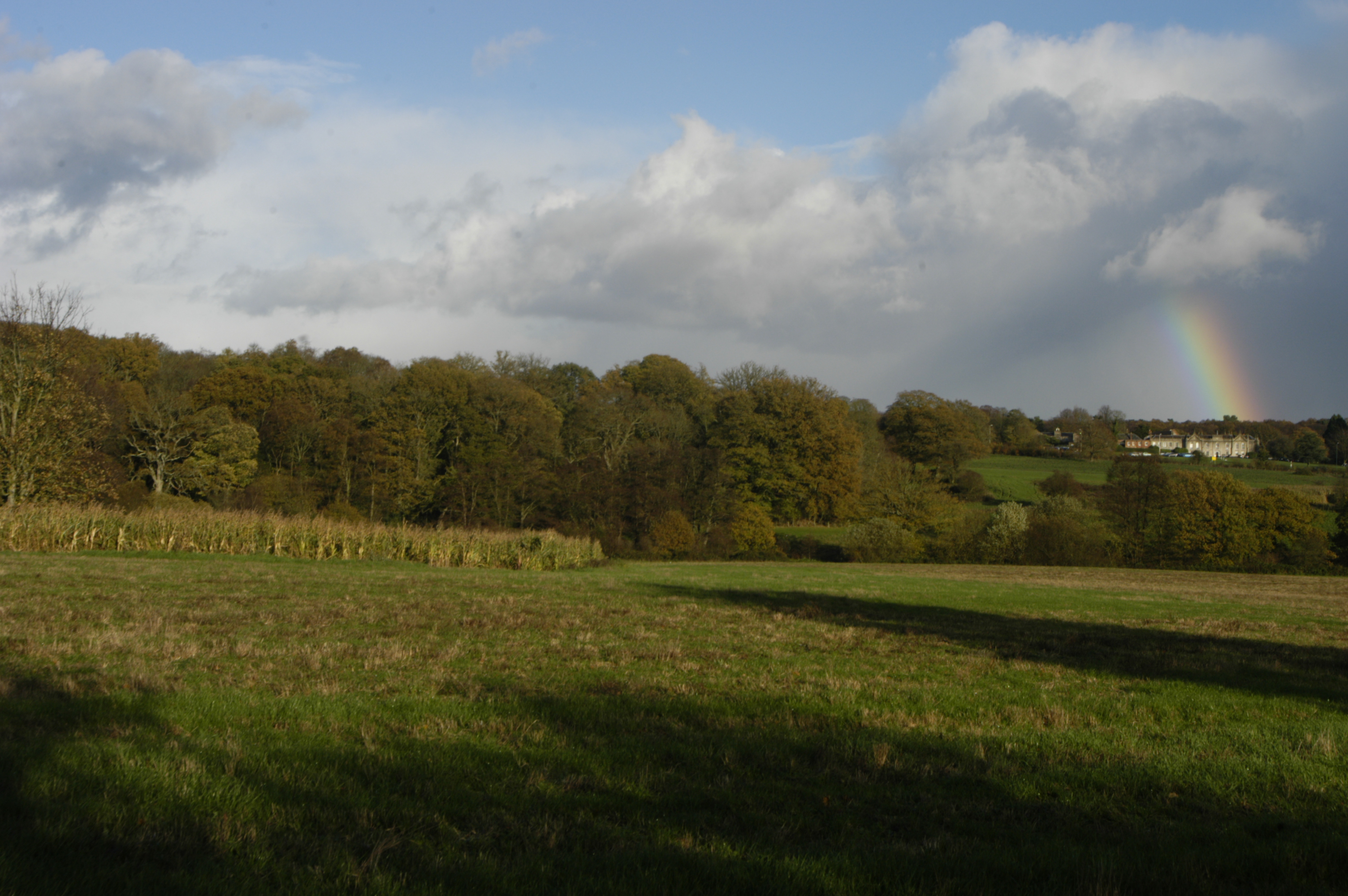
Sandleford Priory, and rainbow, and part of High Wood, from the old carriage track to the west, near Gorse Covert, 2015.

Barn copse is passed on the left or north. A hedge line connects Barn Copse to Dirty Ground Copse, and another hedge line from that forms an arrow with the northern edge of Gorse Covert. Comparison of the 1761 John Rocque map with how things now appear suggests a degree of highly clever tweaking of wood and hedge lines to maximise the effect of the landscape took place in the late eighteenth century. In the far distance on the right, to the south, there is Sidown Hill with its brick folly Heaven's Gate, built in 1749 for Hon. Robert Sawyer Herbert (1693–1769), MP (for Wilton 1722–1768), of Highclere, second son of Thomas Herbert, 8th Earl of Pembroke, visible at about 60 feet high, and next to that Beacon Hill.

As the track passes through the bottle-neck formed by this hedge and the north-east end of Gorse Covert the viewer then goes through to the next instalment, a first distant prospect of Sandleford Priory itself, and the North Downs, including Watership Down.

The track continues due east passing High Wood and a distant view of Slockett's Copse and Crook's Copse beyond to the left or north. Eventually the track reaches the A339 and the main entrance to the priory/school. Through the heart of this block of 500 acres a small stream runs north south from the top of Crook's Copse, down between High Wood and Slockett's Copse and then having been joined by another smaller stream runs east parallel with the southern edge of High Wood and then turns south again towards the River Enborne.

In 1749 Elizabeth Montagu wrote to her husband from Tunbridge Wells: My Dearest, ... I flatter myself the Captain will think Berkshire not inferior to Surry [sic], especially if he bestrides his Arabian steed, and surveys the prospects from Newbury Wash, Greenham &c. When he is tired of mere cows and sheep, and would behold some of those fair creatures, Father Philip's geese,

Mrs. Montagu's views on landscape, indicating that parks and gardens should be under the care of the cherub Contemplation, are somewhat revealed in a letter to Gilbert West, dated 1753, 25th:

'I suppose you have been at Stowe, where art has exhausted all her powers,'

Equel, che il bello, o il caro accresce all' opre

L'arte, che tutto fa, nulla si Scopre

'Such, I am told, is its present state; when I saw the gardens they brought not so much to one's imagination the scenes of paradise, as of that garden, where the sapient king with his fair spouse held dalliance; it is rather a retreat for the proud and victorious, than the philosophic mind; like the poets, it was an Elysian only for heroes; ambition found examples there, and restless emulation fair incitements, but no quiet scenes hushed the passions into peace, and excluded the visions of this world's vanities; which, I take to be the great benefit of the retreat which should put the mind into the guardian care of the cherub Contemplation.'

In September 1757 Mrs Montagu wrote to Dr. Messenger Monsey (1693–1788), FRS, ... I assure you we have Groves too at Sandleford, where you may meet your Amante Sposa, Dame Melancholy, as often as you please....

=== Job creation scheme ===
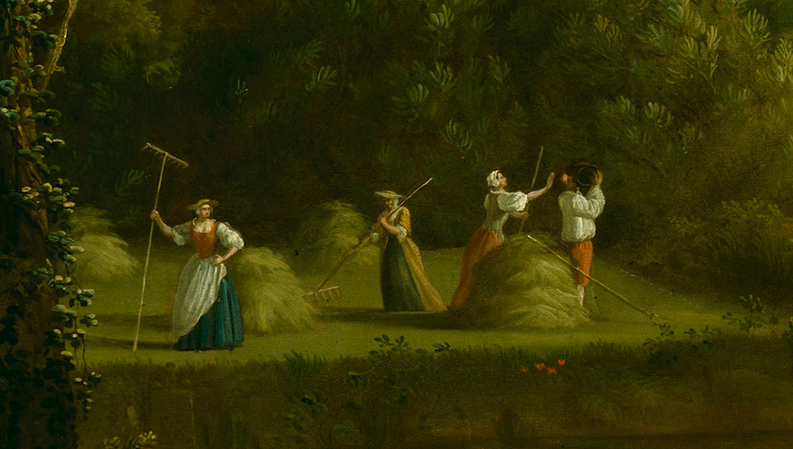
Detail of Haytley's painting, with Sandleford haymakers, circa 1744.

In July 1782 Mrs Montagu mentioned the high unemployment then found in Newbury and the works going on at Sandleford: The scene is extremely animated; 20 men at work in the wood and grove, and the fields around are full of haymakers. The persons employed on the work are poor weavers who by the decay of our manufacture at Newbury are void of employment, and not having been trained to the business of agriculture are not dexterous at the rake and pitchfork, but the plain digging and driving wheel barrows they can perform and are very glad to get their daily subsistence.

=== Tourist attraction ===
In a letter dated Deal, 21 July 1786, Elizabeth Carter wrote to her friend Elizabeth Montagu: 'Your letter, my dear friend, ... The trouble which you receive from the curiosity of people to see your improvements at Sandleford, is one of the natural embarras des richesses. Nobody plagues me by besieging my doors in carriages, and upon pillions to see my cottage. After all, however, it is very strange how people can be so impertinent, one would think they might at least suspend their impatient curiosity till you were absent'.

A year later Elizabeth Carter, in a letter, dated Deal, 22 June 1787, pointed to the music of the groves: ' ... By this time, my dear friend, I hope you are enjoying the music of your groves at Sandleford... '.

== Past descriptions of the house and estate ==
=== Elizabeth Montagu 1743 ===
In 1743 Mrs Montagu wrote from Sandleford to her old friend the Duchess of Portland and described her new retreat:

'...I had a very pleasant journey to this place, where I am delighted to find everything that is capable of making retreat agreeable; the garden commands a fine prospect, the most cheerful I ever saw, and not of shirt distance which is only to gratify the pride of seeing, but such as falls within the humble reach of my eyes. We have a pretty village [ Newtown ] on a rising ground just before us.'

Where the cottage chimney smokes,

Fast between two oaks.

'Poverty here is clad in its decent garb of low simplicity, but her tattered robes of misery do not here show want and wretchedness; you would rather imagine pomp was neglected than sufficiency wanted.'

'A silver stream [the Alder stream, aka river Enborne] washes the foot of the village; health, pleasure, and refreshment are the ingredients that qualify this spring; no debauch, or intoxication, arises from its source.'

'Nature has been very indulgent to this country, and has given it enough of wood and water; the first we have here in good plenty, and a power of having more of the latter, as improvements are undertaken.'

'Here are temptations to riding and walking. I go out every evening to take a view of the country; the villages are the neatest I ever saw; every cottage is tight; has a little garden, and is sheltered by fine trees...'

=== Survey 1781 ===
A survey of the 619 acre, 2 roods and 17 perches estate made for Mrs Montagu in 1781, by John Spyers (c1720-1798) on behalf of Lancelot Brown, and used when the lease of 503 acres and 111 acres was sold to William Chatteris on 3 November 1835, shows that in 1835 111 acres were owned outright by the Lord Rokeby on the east side (mostly in the parish of Greenham), that 87 acres on the east side belonged to the Dean and Canons of Windsor (held by Lord Rokeby), and that 416 acres on the west side of the road (also leased from the Dean and Canons of Windsor by Lord Rokeby), with 5 acres belonging to Mrs Colman near the mill. One question regarding this 1781 survey is whether it was a depiction of what work was to be done, as conceived by Lancelot Brown, or more likely exactly how the estate was at the time? Meanwhile, the 1871 map shows the landscape as it might have been embellished by Brown, especially regarding the ponds near Broadmoor and Waterleaze woods. It is also possible that this 1871 map was based on a lost map made by Brown as a result of works undertaken after that 1781 survey.

In November 1762 replying to a letter from her husband Mrs Montagu wrote:You are very good in consulting me about the Trees..., which suggests that landscape works had been going on post the Rocque map of 1761 and preceding Capability Brown's involvement post 1781, more in a style as seen at Studley Royal/Fountains Abbey or as painted by people like Jacob van Ruisdael, Antonie Waterloo (1609–1690), or Thomas Gainsborough (1727–1788).

87 acres of coppices on the west side (acres, roods, perches)

- Waterleaze and Broadmoor coppice: 41 2 09
- High Wood coppice: 18 3 10
- Upper Moor coppice: 2 01 10 (now Gorse covert)
- Lower Moor coppice: 3 1 01 (now Gorse covert)
- Dirty Ground: 5 0 17
- Orchard House coppice: 5 2 10 (now Slockett's copse)
- Wilsons coppice: 4 0 06 (now Barn copse)
- Parting Ground coppice: 5 2 16 (now Crook's copse)
- Furze close border: 0 2 16 (near Orchard House coppice)
- Hassocks above Halls mead: 0 2 12 (linear or ghost wood east of Parting Ground coppice).

60 acres of meadowland on the west side (acres, roods, perches)

- Upper mill mead;
- Lower mill mead;
- Mill mead;
- Grabbed piddle;
- Pound meadow;
- Over way cow leaze;
- Upper peat mead;
- Upper eight acres;
- Four acres;
- Ireland;
- Halls mead.

227 and 40 acres of arable on the west side (acres, roods, perches)

- Great Water leaze 12 2 19;
- The Pond 0 3 24;
- Middle Leaze 14 1 15;
- Upper Moor 13 1 21;
- Lower Moor 11 1 30;
- Fulwars 16 0 33;
- Picked Harts 10 3 24;
- Round Harts 20 2 14;
- High wood close 16 1 0;
- Fatting Leaze 19 3 03;
- Adams ground 20 1 6;
- Parting ground 15 0 22;
- High Field 23 2 28;
- Gravel close 3 1 13;
- Furz ground 28 3 15;

and

- Newberry [sic] grounds, (aka Tydehams, alias Tidlaws), comprised three fields on the brow of the slope north of Monks' Lane, looking north down towards Newbury, that totalled 40 2 00. (These 40 acres were developed into Newbury's smartest cul-de-sac from March 1923 when Dr. George Alan Simmons (died 1951) bought 42 acres from Christopher Saunders, who had acquired them in 1911 from the trustees of the estate of Alpin Macgregor, late owner of the Sandleford Priory Estate. There were 10 houses by 1928; 12 by 1931; 25 by 1941; 28 in 1963; 30 by 1982; and 39 in 2010. Major-general Llewelyn Alberic Emilius Price-Davies, VC, CB, CMG, DSO, lived briefly, 1926–1929, at the house variously known as Badsworth, Mary Leen and Lustleigh).

The 16 acres field known as Fulwars was no doubt named after Fulwar Craven, 4th Baron Craven (1704–1764), of nearby Benham Park and Hampstead Marshall, High Steward of Newbury 1739–1764, and a founder of the Craven hunt. The 1781 survey map also shows the Montagu purchases of coppices (such as Little Peckmore and Collin's coppices) and water-meadows at Peckmore and on the north side of the Auborn stream (alias river Enborne), and its layout before its severe disturbance by the new west-east running A339; re-routed along the river Enborne as a result of two of the old roads to Newbury that formerly crossed Greenham Common south-north being severed when the airport was made circa 1942. The map also shows a Rick yard; farm yard, with a very large barn; the Green yard in front of the priory; a Wilderness walk; and a Bowling green. The map shows the stream that flows south into the river Enborne (aka Auborne stream) which also marked the border of the parishes of Greenham and Sandleford and was to provide the water that formed what is known as Brown's (extant), Woodhouse (derelict), and Newtown ponds (seems to have disappeared). Collin's coppice ran just east of the priory's demesne, near where the first ponds were formed. Collin's coppice still exists at the south-western corner of Greenham Common, as does Peckmoor, an arable field now a grazed part of Bunker farm.

=== Mary Morgan 1791 ===
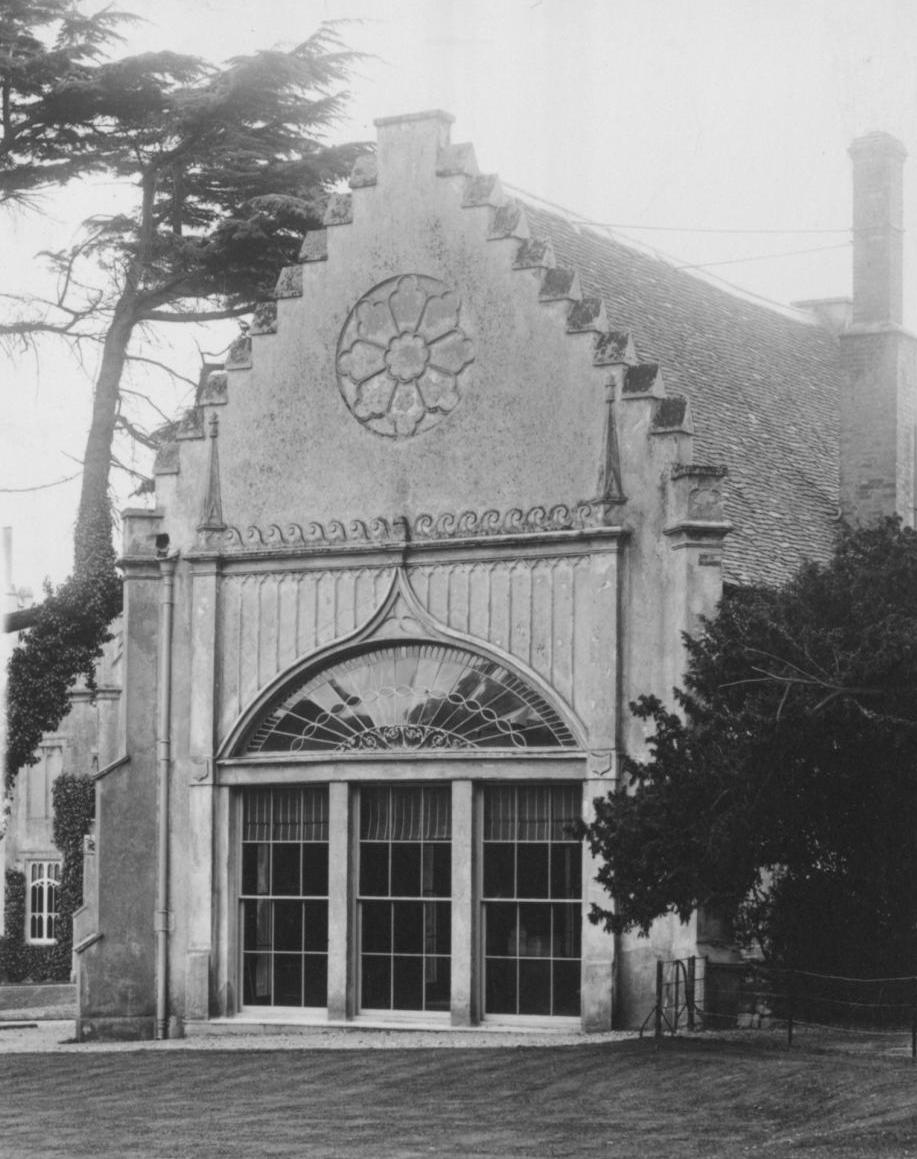
Photograph of Wyatt's alteration to the chapel at Sandleford Priory, 1906, by Evelyn Elizabeth Myers (c. 1872–1909).

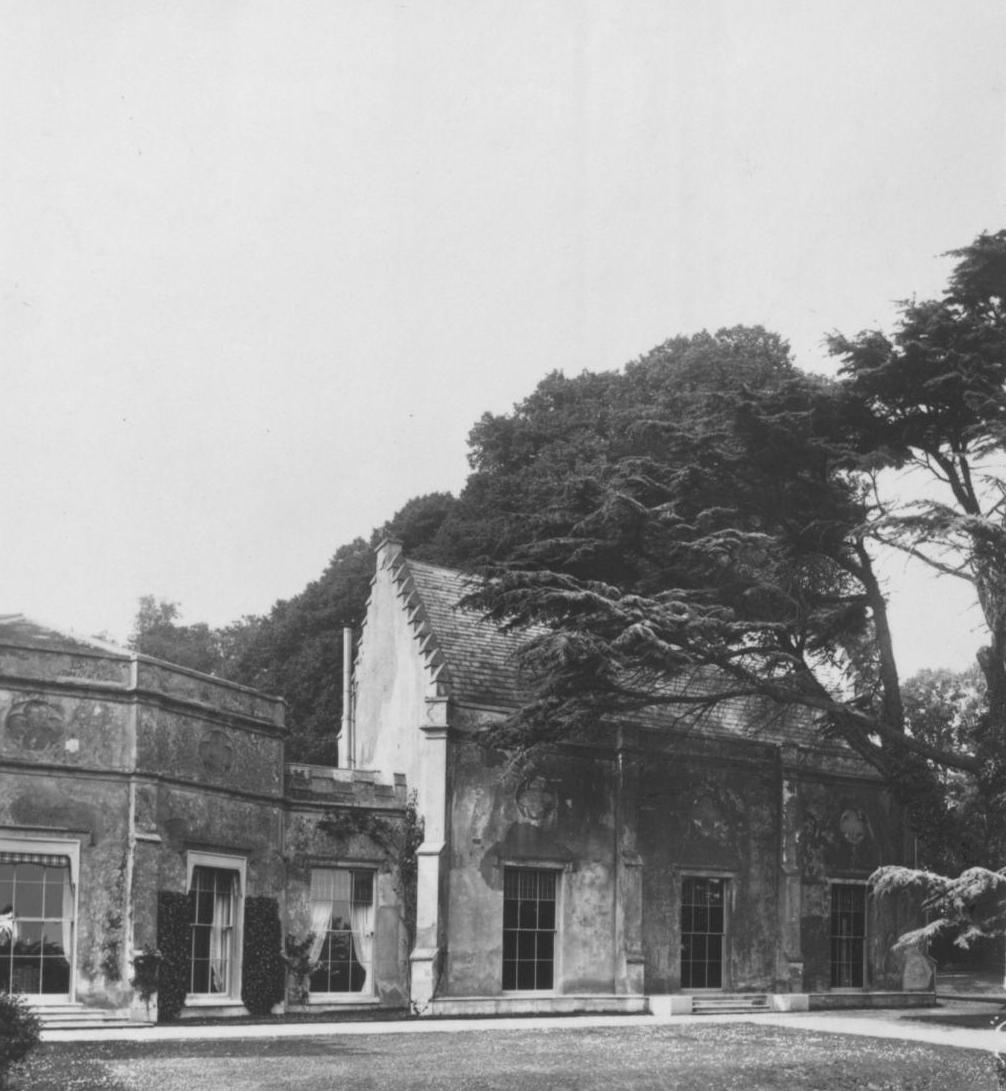
Photograph of the chapel at Sandleford Priory, 1906, by Evelyn Elizabeth Myers (c. 1872–1909).

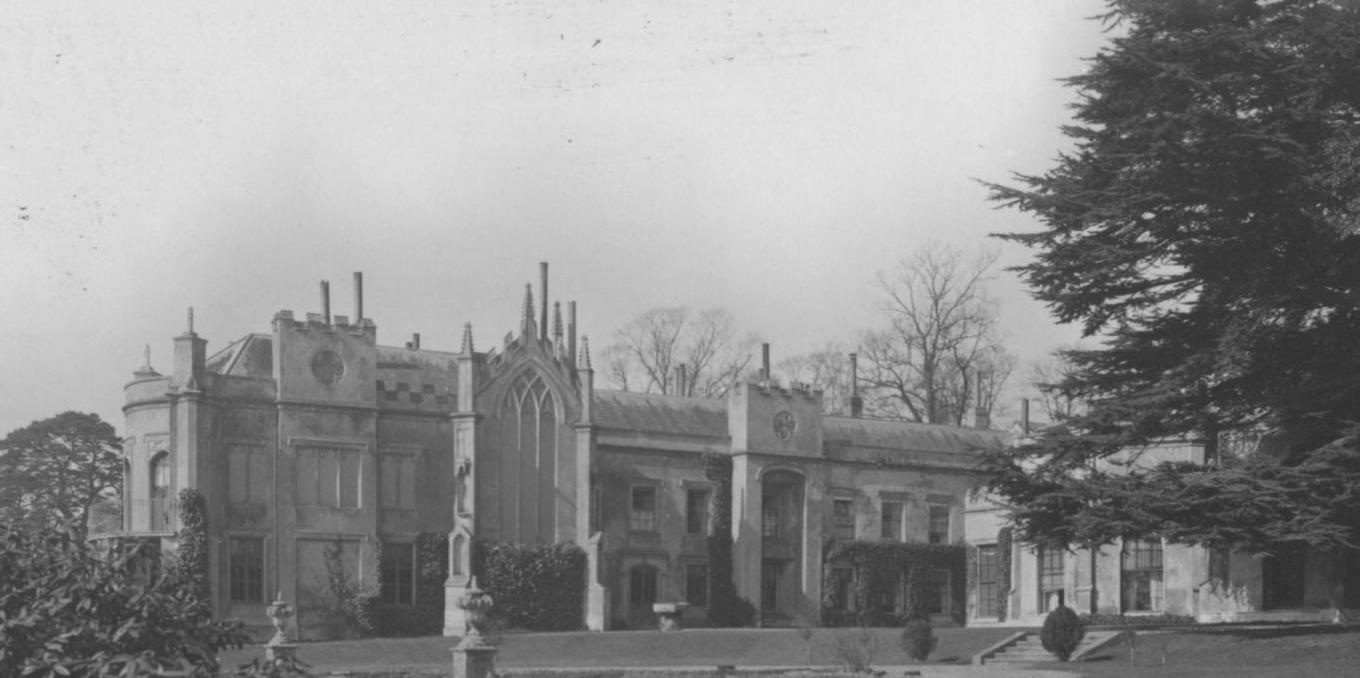
Photograph of Sandleford Priory, 1906, by Evelyn Elizabeth Myers (c. 1872–1909).

- Mary Morgan (died 11 July 1808, aged 59), one of the two daughters of the Ipswich composer Joseph Gibbs (died 1788), and wife to Rev. Caesar Morgan, DD, (died 1812, aged 62), vicar of Wisbech and then Rector of St James' Church, Stretham, Cambridgeshire and (from 1804) a Prebendary of Ely, in her A Tour to Milford Haven, in the year 1791 published in 1795, wrote (Letter V, To Miss B _ _ _ _ , Burfield [ Burghfield ], 13 July 1791):

...I felt myself sufficiently gratified, that a great portion of genius is possessed by my sex; I was entirely devoid of dread or envy. After driving twenty miles through a very pleasant country, and through the pretty town of Newbury, we entered Mrs. Montagu's park, which seemed to have undergone some recent improvements, as the trees were many of them newly planted. The approach to the house is a fine lawn, with sheep feeding upon it. This gives you the idea of beauty blended with utility, which always produces agreeable sensations in the mind...

...In this wing is an elegant dressing-room above stairs. This too has a large bow, on the outside of which there is a very spacious balcony, surrounded by iron balustrades. The balcony commands a distant view of the Hampshire hills, and an extensive diversified country. The small village of Newton in the Valley has an humble simplicity in it, that is agreeably contrasted with the lofty hills beyond it...

...When we withdrew to go to bed, we were ushered up stairs by the major domo, with a wax light in each hand. I found the bedroom lighted up, and a female waiting in it ready to undress me. Mrs M.-- was not conducted into my room, but into a dressing-room adjoining, by a door that opened into a passage. Reflecting on this, to me unusual ceremony, I almost began to fancy myself a bride again; or else, that I was transported into some fairy region, where I was to be waited upon by spirits, that were every where attending without being called for...

...In the dressing-room there was a collection of books; amongst them I found your friend Miss Cornelia Knight's Dinarbas. Here you may amuse yourself in the morning, if you please, till dinner calls you again to society.

The grounds are laid out with the same Attic taste, as the house. Through a great part of them Mrs. Montagu has trained a river, which was little more than a ditch; and means to extend it still further... she has likewise cut a winding path through her plantations. It is a carriage way and is a mile in length. It is also a very pleasant walk, and may serve; 'or for study, or for love' being perfectly secluded. At agreeable distances are benches under the shadow of a large tree, or the shelter of a close hedge interwoven with woodbines and honeysuckles.

When walking in the grounds, I observed an extraordinary degree of cleanliness and decency in the men, who were at work in them. Upon enquiry I found they were all fed and cloathed by her hand. I perceived too that many of them had some great defect, occasioned by age, natural infirmity, or misfortune, being either blind, deaf, dumb, or lame; yet she so paired them, and fitted their employments to their several faculties, that the remaining senses of one served to supply the deficiencies of the other. By this stroke of benevolent ingenuity, though she does not get so much work done, as she would by stronger and abler men; she has the heart-felt satisfaction of making those useful and happy members of society, whom nobody else would employ, and who, but for her, must be dependent upon a parish for an idle and scanty substance. I hope it is not prophane to say, she has made the blind to see, the deaf to hear, the dumb to speak, and the lame to walk. The whole of this place suggested to me the idea of a Roman villa. There is every thing for use as well as beauty. The farm and dairy are not omitted; they supply the family and table with all things necessary and delicate. In short, there is a style in every part of it, that bespeaks a superior degree of judgment. Nothing is gaudy or superfluous, yet nothing is wanting. Native genius, matured by observation upon what is simply elegant, has guided the hand of the amiable possessor of this enchanting place... Adieu.

A few days later she continued: (To Miss B., Letter IX, Woodstock, 16 July 1791): Having before described Sandleford to you, I cannot help observing, that it is a striking contrast to Blenheim. But it is such a one, as when the eye, dazzled with gazing at the sun, falls on the soft green of a beautiful lawn, upon which it may rest for ever without satiety or weariness. At Sandleford the mind is gratified with everything that can render life rational and happy. At Blenheim it is fatigued with contemplating objects, that seem like a golden dream, too gay and too gaudy to be real.

Morgan's list of subscribers shows that Elizabeth Montagu, aka Montagu, Mrs. Portman Square-10 copies., and her nephew (the son of Rev. William Robinson, rector of Burghfield), aka Robinson, Rev. Mr. Rector of Coveney, in the Isle of Ely-6 copies., evidently appreciated this ebullient description.

=== William Cobbett 1821 ===
The Radical MP and journalist William Cobbett (1762–1835) wrote about Sandleford in his journal whilst staying with the farmer Mr. Budd at Burghclere, on 30 October 1821. Appropriately 150 years later Budd's Farm was home to the writer Roger Mortimer. This is the gist of it:

'...Came through a place called "a park" belonging to a Mr. Montague, who is now abroad;
Of all the ridiculous things I ever saw in my life this place is the most ridiculous. The house looks like a sort of church, in somewhat of a gothic style of building, with crosses on the tops of different parts of the pile. There is a sort of swamp, at the foot of a wood, at no great distance from the front of the house'.

'...Here is a fountain, the basin of which is not four feet over, and the water spout not exceeding the pour from a tea-pot. Here is a bridge over a river of which a child four years old would clear the banks at a jump...'
'...In short, such fooleries I never before beheld; but what I disliked most was the apparent impiety of a part of these works of refined taste'.
'...I wonder how long this sickly, this childish, taste is to remain?'
'..At the end of this scene of mock grandeur and mock antiquity I found something more rational; namely, some hare hounds, and, in half-an-hour after, we found, and I had the first hare-hunt that I had had since I wore a smock-frock !'

== Bibliography ==
- Stephen Bending, Green Retreats, women, gardens and eighteenth-century culture, Cambridge University Press, 2013.
- Evelyn Elizabeth Myers (c.1872–1909), A History of Sandleford Priory, Newbury District Field Club, Special Publication. no. 1. (finished by 1906) published 1931.
- Elizabeth Montagu, the Queen of the Bluestockings. Her correspondence from 1720–1761, John Murray, London, by Emily J. Climenson, 1906.
- Penelope Stokes, Enborne and Wash Common, Hamstead Marshall, 2011.
- Walter Money, FSA, A history of the ancient town and borough of Newbury, in the county of Berkshire, Parker & Co., Oxford & London, 1887.
- Transactions of the Newbury District Field Club, volume 12, no. 6, The history of Sandleford Priory, 1980–1981, Miss C. Sheila Hay;
- Transactions of the Newbury District Field Club, volume 13, 1983–1989, Sandleford Priory: the missing years, by Norman E. Fox, pps. 51–59;
- Burke's Landed Gentry of Ireland, Burke, London, 1912;
- A genealogical and heraldic history of the commoners of Great Britain, by John Burke, volume IV, page 257, 1838;
- The History of Parliament: the House of Commons 1604–1629, edited by Andrew Thrush and John P. Ferris, 2010;
- The History of Parliament: the House of Commons 1660–1690, edited by B.D. Henning, 1983;
- The History of Parliament: the House of Commons 1690–1715, edited by D. Hayton, E. Cruickshanks, S. Handley, 2002;
- The History of Parliament: the House of Commons 1715–1754, edited by Rodney Sedgwick, 1970;
- The History of Parliament: the House of Commons 1754–1790, edited by L. Namier, J. Brooke, 1964;
- Capability Brown by Dorothy Stroud, Faber & Faber, London, 1975;
- The Omnipotent Magician, by Jane Brown, Pimlico, London, 2012;
- A lady of the last century (Mrs. Elizabeth Montagu): illustrated in her unpublished letters, by Dr. John Doran, Bentley, 1873;
- Betty Rizzo, Companions without Vows : Relationships among Eighteenth Century British Women, University of Georgia, 1994, pages 128–141;
- A Tour to Milford Haven, in the year 1791, by Mary Morgan, London, 1795;
- William Cobbett, Rural Rides, London, 1853.
- Sir William Dugdale, Monasticon Anglicanum: a History of the Abbies and other Monasteries, Hospitals, Frieries, and Cathedral and Collegiate Churches, with their Dependencies, in England and Wales, Longman, Hurst, Rees, Orme & Brown, London, 1817–1830, volume VI, p. 565.
- A Topographical Map of the County of Berks, by John Rocque, Topographer to His Majesty, 1761.
- Magna Britannia: Bedfordshire, Berkshire, Buckinghamshire, by Daniel Lysons, 1813.
- Magna Britannia: Being a Concise Topographical Account of the several counties of Great Britain, Volume 1, by Daniel and Samuel Lysons, 1806.
- A History of the County of Berkshire, Volume four, edited by William Page and P H Ditchfield, Victoria County History, London, 1924.
- The life of William Wilberforce, by Robert Isaac and Samuel Wilberforce, 1839.
- The History and Antiquities of Newbury and its environs, by Edward William Gray, Speenhamland, 1839.
- F. Nigel Hepper, in Arboricultural Journal: The International Journal of Urban Forestry, Volume 25, Issue 3, 2001 : The cultivation of the cedar of Lebanon in western European parks and gardens from the 17th to the 19th century.
- The Letters of Mrs. Elizabeth Montagu, edited by her nephew Matthew Montagu, MP, London, 1809.
- The Letters of Mrs. Elizabeth Montagu, published by Matthew Montagu, Esq., her nephew & executor, volume III, London, 1813.
- The Letters of Mrs. Elizabeth Montagu, edited by Matthew Montagu, volume IV, Cambridge University Press, 2015.
- Letters of Elizabeth Carter to Elizabeth Montagu, London, 1817.
- Capability Brown & Belvoir: Discovering a Lost Landscape, by Emma, Duchess of Rutland, & Jane Pruden, published by Nick McCann, 2015.
