= Montgomery (surname) =

Montgomery (also spelled Montgomerie) is a toponymic surname derived from Saint-Germain-de-Montgommery and Sainte-Foy-de-Montgommery in Normandy, France.

The earliest known person to be styled with the name is Roger de Montgomerie, found in a contemporary document as father of the 11th century Norman nobleman, Roger de Montgomery, 1st Earl of Shrewsbury, who owned the village of Montgommery, today in the Calvados département. Alternatively, a Hugh de Montgomery is given as the earl's father by a Norman chronicler writing in the next generation and some have hypothesized an error whereby Hugh is actually father of the elder Roger.

The original family Counts de Montgomerie were prominent in early Anglo-Norman England and gave their name to Montgomeryshire in neighbouring Wales. In some cases, the surname of modern Montgomerys is probably derived from this Welsh place name (the Scottish Montgomerys for example). Seventeen counties in the United States of America as well as districts, neighbourhoods and streets around the world, have been named for people named Montgomery.

In Scotland, the surname has occasionally been gaelicized as Mac Gumaraid, and in Ireland as Mac Iomaire.

== Family ==
- Montgomerie family, Earls of Shrewsbury, a noble family of Anglo-Norman origin
- Clan Montgomery, a Lowland Scottish clan

== A ==
- Al Montgomery (1920–1942), American baseball player
- Alexander Montgomerie (disambiguation)
- Alexander Montgomery (disambiguation)
- Anne Montgomery (disambiguation)
- Anthony Montgomery (born 1971), American actor
- Anthony Montgomery (American football) (born 1984), American football player
- Archibald Montgomerie (1812–1861), British politician

== B ==
- Belinda Montgomery (born 1950), Canadian-American actress
- Ben Montgomery (1819–1877), American inventor
- Bernard Montgomery (1887–1976), British army officer
- Bob Montgomery (disambiguation)
- Braden Montgomery (born 2003), American baseball player
- Brent Montgomery, American entrepreneur
- Brett Montgomery (born 1973), Australian rules footballer
- Brian D. Montgomery (born 1956), American politician
- Bryan Montgomery (1946–2008), American actor

== C ==
- C. Dick Montgomery (1926–2003), American politician
- Charles Montgomery (disambiguation)
- Chase Montgomery (born 1983), American stock car racing driver
- Chris Montgomery (born 1972), American multimedia programmer
- Chris Montgomery (rugby league), Australian rugby league footballer
- Cliff Montgomery (1910–2005), American football player
- Colin Montgomerie (born 1963), Scottish professional golfer
- Colson Montgomery (born 2002), American baseball player
- Cynthia A. Montgomery (born 1952), American economist

== D ==
- Dabney Montgomery (1923–2016), American bodyguard for Martin Luther King Jr.
- Dacre Montgomery (born 1994), Australian actor
- Daniel Montgomery Jr. (1765–1831), American pioneer
- David Montgomery (disambiguation)
- Deane Montgomery (1909–1992), American mathematician
- Derek Montgomery (born 1950), English footballer
- D. J. Montgomery (born 1996), American football player
- Douglass Montgomery (1909–1966), American actor

== E ==
- Earl Montgomery (actor) (1921–1987), American actor
- Earl Montgomery (director), (1894–1966), American film director, writer, and comedian
- Eddie Montgomery, singer with Montgomery Gentry
- Edmund Montgomery (1835–1911), Scottish-American philosopher
- Edward Montgomery (disambiguation)
- E. J. Montgomery (born 1999), American basketball player
- Eleanor Montgomery (1946–2013), American high jumper
- Elizabeth Montgomery (1933–1995), American actress
- Elizabeth Montgomery (designer) (1902–1993), English theatre and costume designer

== F ==
- Flora Montgomery (born 1974), British actress
- Florence Montgomery (1843–1923), English novelist and children's writer
- Florence M. Montgomery (1914–1998), American art historian and curator
- Frances Trego Montgomery (1858 – 1925), American children's book writer
- Frank Montgomery (disambiguation)

== G ==
- George Montgomery (disambiguation)
- Glenn Montgomery (1967–1998), American football player
- Gustaf Adolf Montgomery (1790–1861), Finnish colonel who served in the Finnish War

== H ==
- Henry Montgomery (disambiguation)
- Howard Montgomery (1916–1980), American football and basketball player
- Hue Montgomery (died 2026), English soul singer
- Hugh Montgomery (disambiguation)

== J ==
- Jack Montgomery (disambiguation)
- Janet Montgomery (born 1985), British actress
- James Montgomery (disambiguation)
- Jeff Montgomery (disambiguation)
- Jerry Montgomery (born 1979), American football player and coach
- Jessie Montgomery, American composer
- Jessie Montgomery (Exeter), education and suffrage activist
- Jim Montgomery (disambiguation)
- Joe Montgomery (born 1976), American football player
- Joe D. Montgomery (1918–2013), American politician and educator
- John Montgomerie (disambiguation)
- John Montgomery (disambiguation)
- Jon Montgomery (born 1979), Canadian skeleton racer
- Jordan Montgomery (born 1992), American baseball player
- Joseph Montgomery (1733–1794), American minister

== K ==
- Kenneth Montgomery (1943–2023), British conductor
- Kenneth Barbour Montgomery (1897–1965), English air force officer

== L ==
- Lee Montgomery (born 1961), Canadian-American actor
- Lemuel P. Montgomery (1786–1814), American military officer
- Lewis Montgomery (died 1568), English politician
- Lisa Montgomery (disambiguation)
- Little Brother Montgomery (1906–1985), American musician
- Lokalia Montgomery (1903–1978), American Hawaiian cultural historian and artist
- Lou Montgomery (1920–1993), American college football player
- Lucy Maud Montgomery (1874–1942), Canadian author
- Luke Montgomery (born 1973/1974), American activist
- Luke Montgomery (American football) (born 2004), American football player

== M ==
- Mabel Montgomery (died 1942), American actress
- Mabel Montgomery (writer) (1879–1968), American writer
- Malcolm B. Montgomery (1891–1974), justice of the Supreme Court of Mississippi
- Marion Montgomery (1934–2002), American jazz singer
- Marjorie Montgomery (1912–1991), American dancer and fashion designer
- Mary Montgomery (1956–2017), American swimmer
- Matthew Montgomery (disambiguation)
- Melba Montgomery (1938–2025), American country singer-songwriter
- Mike Montgomery (disambiguation)
- Milton Montgomery (1825–1897), American army officer
- Monty Montgomery (disambiguation)
- Myles Montgomery (born 2003), American football player

== N ==
- Nicholas Montgomery (disambiguation)
- Nick Montgomery (born 1981), British footballer

== O ==
- Olan Montgomery (1963–2020), American actor
- Olea Marion Davis (1899–1977), Canadian artist and craftsperson born Olea Marion Montgomery
- Oscar Montgomery (1895–1967), New Zealand cricket umpire
- Oscar H. Montgomery (1859–1936), Justice of the Indiana Supreme Court

== P ==
- Patrick E. Montgomery (1946–2009), American politician
- Paul Montgomery (1960–1999), American entrepreneur and inventor
- Paul L. Montgomery (1936–2008), American reporter
- Percy Montgomery (born 1974), South African rugby union footballer
- Peter Montgomery (disambiguation)
- Poppy Montgomery (born 1972), Australian actor

== R ==
- R. A. Montgomery (1936–2014), American author
- Ray Montgomerie (born 1961), Scottish footballer
- Ray Montgomery (disambiguation)
- Richard Montgomery (disambiguation)
- Robb Montgomery (born 1964), American journalist, documentary filmmaker, and visual media anthropologist
- Robert Montgomerie (disambiguation)
- Robert Montgomery (disambiguation)
- Robin Montgomery (born 2004), American tennis player
- Roger Montgomery (disambiguation), multiple people
- Ruth Montgomery (1912–2001), American journalist
- Ryan Daniel Montgomery (born 1977), Royce da 5'9" American rapper and songwriter

== S ==
- Sam Montgomery (born 1990), American football player
- Samuel J. Montgomery (1896–1957), American politician
- Scott Montgomery (disambiguation)
- Seth D. Montgomery (1937–1998), American judge
- Seton Montolieu Montgomerie (1846–1883), English noble
- Sonny Montgomery (1920–2006), American army officer and politician
- Stan Montgomery (1920–2000), English footballer
- Steve Montgomery (born 1970), American baseball player
- Steven Montgomery (born 1954), American artist
- Sy Montgomery (born 1958), American naturalist, author and scriptwriter

== T ==
- Thomas George Montgomerie (1830–1878), British Army officer and geographer
- Thomas Montgomery (disambiguation)
- Tim Montgomery (born 1975), American athlete
- Ty Montgomery (born 1993), American football player
- Tyren Montgomery (born 2001), American football player

== V ==
- Viva Seton Montgomerie (1879–1959), British author and socialite

== W ==
- W. Atwood Montgomery (1854–1931), American politician from Maryland
- Wes Montgomery (1923–1968), American jazz guitarist
- William Montgomerie (1797–1856), Scottish military surgeon with East India Company in Singapore
- William Montgomery (disambiguation)
- Wilbert Montgomery (born 1954), American football player

== Z ==
- Zachariah Montgomery (1825–1900), American politician

== Fictional characters ==
- Montgomery, Doctor Moreau's assistant from the science fiction novel The Island of Doctor Moreau
- Addison Montgomery, on the television series Grey's Anatomy and Private Practice
- Aria Montgomery, from the Pretty Little Liars franchise
- Bianca Montgomery, from the soap opera All My Children
- Cheyenne Montgomery, on the sitcom Reba
- Jackson Montgomery, from the soap opera All My Children
- James "Hunter" Montgomery, in the television series Queer as Folk
- Jesse Montgomery III, a main character in the 2000 stoner comedy film Dude, Where's My Car?
- Layton T. Montgomery, a lawyer and secondary antagonist in the film Bee Movie
- Madison Montgomery, on the third season of the television series American Horror Story
- Mike Montgomery, Aria's younger brother, also from the Pretty Little Liars franchise
- Nora Montgomery, on the first season of the television series American Horror Story
- Travis Montgomery, on the television series Station 19
- Van Montgomery, on the television series Reba

== See also ==
- Admiral Montgomery (disambiguation)
- General Montgomery (disambiguation)
- Judge Montgomery (disambiguation)
- Justice Montgomery (disambiguation)
- Senator Montgomery (disambiguation)
- Montgomery (disambiguation)
- Montgomery v Lanarkshire Health Board
