= Alexander Montgomery =

Alexander Montgomery may refer to:

- Alexander Montgomery (1667–1722), Irish MP for Monaghan County 1713–1722
- Alexander Montgomery (1686–1729), Irish MP for Donegal Borough and for Donegal County 1727–1729
- Alexander Montgomery (died 1785) (1721–1785), Irish MP for Monaghan County 1743–1760 and 1768–1783
- Alexander Montgomery (1720–1800), Irish MP for Donegal County 1768–1800
- Sir Alexander Montgomery, 3rd Baronet (1807–1888), a Royal Navy officer
- Alexander B. Montgomery (1837–1910), US Representative from Kentucky
- Alexander Montgomery (Mississippi lawyer) (died 1878), justices of the Supreme Court of Mississippi
- Alexander Montgomery (geologist) (1862–1932), Scottish-born New Zealand/Australian geologist
- Alexander Montgomery (rugby union)

== See also ==
- Alexander Montgomerie (disambiguation)
