= Thomas Montgomery =

Thomas or Tom Montgomery may refer to:

- Thomas Montgomery (Irish politician) (1700–1761), Irish politician
- Thomas Montgomery (American politician) (1779–1828), U.S. representative from Kentucky
- Thomas Montgomery (innkeeper) (1790–1877), Upper Canada militia officer and innkeeper (Montgomery's Inn) in modern-day Etobicoke
- Thomas Harrison Montgomery (1830–1905), American businessman and historian
- Thomas Hartley Montgomery (1842–1873), Royal Irish Constabulary officer and convicted murderer
- Thomas Lynch Montgomery (1862–1929), American librarian
- Thomas Harrison Montgomery Jr. (1873–1912), American zoologist
- Thomas M. Montgomery (born 1941), United States Army general
- Thomas Montgomery, American murderer, subject of the 2009 documentary film Talhotblond
- Tom Montgomery, Welsh politician

== See also ==
- Thomas George Montgomerie (1830–1878), British surveyor
