= Montgomery baronets of The Hall (1808) =

Extinct baronetcy

The Montgomery baronetcy, of The Hall in the County of Donegal, was created in the Baronetage of the United Kingdom on 3 October 1808 for Conyngham Montgomery, Member of Parliament for Mitchell, County Donegal and Yarmouth. The second Baronet was sworn of the Privy Council in 1876. The title became extinct on the death of the fifth Baronet in 1939.

== Montgomery baronets, of The Hall (1808) ==
- Sir (Henry) Conyngham Montgomery, 1st Baronet (1765–1830)
- Sir Henry Conyngham Montgomery, 2nd Baronet (1803–1878)
- Admiral Sir Alexander Leslie Montgomery, 3rd Baronet (1807–1888)
- Sir Hugh Conyngham Gaston Montgomery, 4th Baronet (1847–1915)
- Sir Alexander Cecil Montgomery, 5th Baronet (1859–1939)

Baronetage of the United Kingdom
Preceded by Buller baronets	Montgomery baronets of The Hall; 3 October 1808	Succeeded by Tyrwhitt Jones baronets
