= Robert Montgomery =

Robert Montgomery or Bob Montgomery may refer to:

== Entertainment ==
- Robert Montgomery (poet) (1807–1855), English poet and minister
- Robert Montgomery (actor) (1904–1981), American actor and director
- Robert Douglass Montgomery (1909–1966), American actor
- Robert Bruce Montgomery (1921–1978), crime writer under the pen name Edmund Crispin
- Bob Montgomery (songwriter) (1937–2014), American singer, songwriter, and music producer
- Robert Montgomery (artist) (born 1972), Scottish artist

== Politics and law ==
- Robert Montgomery (margrave) (1680–1731), British speculator behind proposed Margravate of Azilia
- Robert Montgomery (civil servant) (1809–1887), Irish-born British colonial official in India
- Robert Montgomery Martin (c. 1801–1868), Colonial Treasurer of Hong Kong from 1844–45
- Robert Morris Montgomery (1849–1920), American jurist
- Robert Mortimer Montgomery (1869–1948), British politician, school administrator, and legal writer
- Robert Montgomery (lawyer) (1930–2008), American litigator
- Robert Montgomery (politician) (born 1949), Republican member of the Kansas House of Representatives

== Sports ==
- Robert Montgomery (sport shooter) (1891–1964), Canadian sport shooter at the 1920 Summer Olympics
- Bob Montgomery (boxer) (1919–1998), American lightweight boxer
- Bob Montgomery (baseball) (born 1944), American catcher and commentator
- Robert Montgomery (boxer) (born 1983), Canadian super heavyweight boxer who represented Canada at the 2006 Commonwealth Games

== Other ==
- Robert Montgomery (archbishop) (1541–1611), Archbishop of Glasgow
- Robert Montgomery (Medal of Honor) (1838–after 1864), American naval captain and Medal of Honor recipient
- Robert R. Montgomery (1843–1930), American who invented fly swatters in 1900
- Robert Montgomery (British Army officer) (1848–1931), British general
- Robert Hiester Montgomery (1872–1953), American accountant and educator
- Robert Montgomery (physician), American transplant surgeon
- Bob Montgomery (psychologist), Australian convicted in 2021 for child sexual abuse

== See also ==
- Robert Montgomerie (disambiguation)
- Montgomery (name)
