= Edward Montgomery =

Edward Mongtomery may refer to:

- Ed Montgomery (musician) (born 1952), American gospel musician
- Edward S. Montgomery (1910–1992), 1951 Pulitzer Prize-winning journalist
- Edward B. Montgomery (born 1955), former U.S. Deputy Secretary of Labor and economist
- Edward Montgomery (Australian politician) (1906–1986), Victorian state MP
- Edward William Montgomery (1865–1948), Canadian cabinet minister
- Eddie Montgomery, musician with Montgomery Gentry
