= John Montgomery =

John Montgomery or Montgomerie may refer to:

== Politicians ==
- John Montgomery (Leominster MP), 14th-century MP for Leominster
- John Montgomerie (Ayrshire MP) (1680–1731), MP for Ayrshire 1710–27
- John Montgomerie (died 1725), Scottish businessman and politician, MP for Linlithgowshire 1704–7, for Buteshire 1710
- John Montgomery (Continental Congress) (1722–1808), U.S. merchant, continental congressman for Pennsylvania
- John Montgomery (Maryland politician) (1764–1828), U.S. lawyer, congressman from Maryland
- John Montgomery (Oklahoma politician), member of the Oklahoma Senate
- John Montgomery (shipbuilder) (1800–1867), Canadian shipbuilder, merchant and politician in New Brunswick
- John Flournoy Montgomery (1878–1954), U.S. ambassador to Hungary during World War II
- John Gallagher Montgomery (1805–1857), U.S. lawyer, congressman for Pennsylvania
- John M. Montgomery (1843–1895), Canadian politician from Prince Edward Island
- John Montgomery (died 1733), Irish M.P. for County Monaghan, Ireland
- John Montgomery (1747–1797), Irish soldier and M.P
- John Montgomery (died 1741) (1719–1741), M.P. for County Monaghan, Ireland

== Military ==
- John Montgomery (pioneer) (1750–1794), American Revolutionary officer and pioneer in Illinois and Tennessee
- John B. Montgomery (1794–1872), United States Navy admiral

== Sports ==
- John Montgomery (footballer), Scottish footballer
- John Montgomery (equestrian) (1881–1948), American horse rider and Olympic medalist
- John Montgomerie (chess player) (1911–1995), Scottish chess player
- John Montgomery (pole vaulter) (born 1921), American pole vaulter, 1948 and 1949 All-American for the USC Trojans track and field team

== Others ==
- John Montgomery (tavern-keeper) (1788–1879), Canadian tavern-keeper in 1837 Rebellion
- John Joseph Montgomery (1858–1911), U.S. pioneer in aviation
- J. Alastair Montgomerie (1914–1989), Scottish businessman and Royal Navy officer
- John Montgomery (writer), 1919-1992, American chronicler of the beatniks
- John Leslie Montgomery (1923–1968), birth name of Wes Montgomery, American jazz guitarist
- John Warwick Montgomery (1931–2024), American lawyer and academic
- John Montgomery (art historian) (1951–2005), Pre-Columbian art historian
- John R. Montgomery, advertising industry veteran and television producer
- John Michael Montgomery (born 1965), American country singer

== See also ==
- John Montgomerie (died 1731), Scottish-American colonial governor
- John Montgomerie Bell (1804–1862), Scottish lawyer
- Jack Montgomery (disambiguation)
- Montgomery (disambiguation)
- John (disambiguation)
