= Thomas Harrison Montgomery Jr. =

American zoologist (1873–1912)

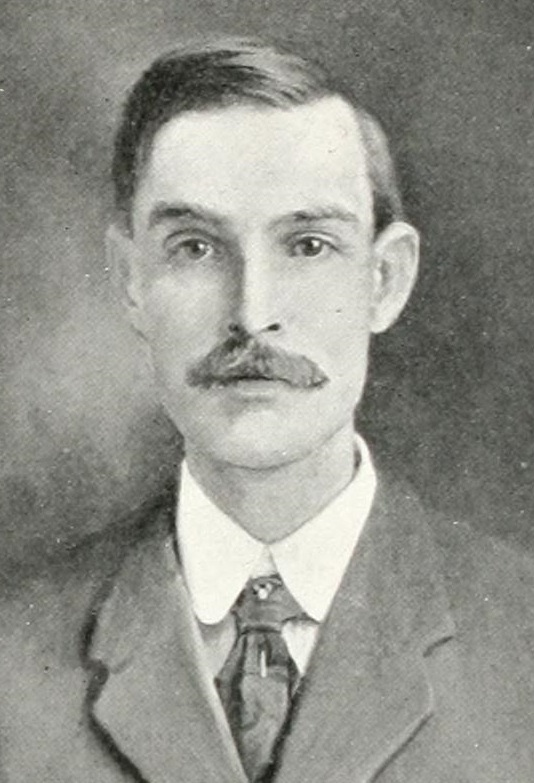
- Born: March 5, 1873; New York City, U.S.
- Died: March 19, 1912 (aged 39); Philadelphia, Pennsylvania, U.S.
- Education: University of Pennsylvania, University of Berlin
- Known for: Chromosome and cell research
- Scientific career
- Fields: Zoology, Cytology
- Workplaces: University of Pennsylvania, University of Texas
- Doctoral advisor: Franz Eilhard Schulze

Thomas Harrison Montgomery Jr. (March 5, 1873 – March 19, 1912) was an American zoologist who made important contributions to cell biology–especially in chromosomes and their roles in sex determination–as well as the biology of birds and several groups invertebrates, naming many species of ribbon worms, rotifers, and spiders. He studied in Berlin before becoming a researcher and professor at the University of Pennsylvania, where he primarily worked until his death at the age of 39. In his short career he published 80 scientific papers and two books.

== Early life and family ==
Montgomery was born in New York City on March 5, 1873, to a wealthy Pennsylvania family. His father, Thomas Harrison Montgomery Sr., was a businessman and writer who authored several historical accounts (Note: see Thomas Harrison Montgomery and A History of the University of Pennsylvania from its Foundation to A. D. 1770 at WikiSource) and was president of the Insurance Company of North America from 1882 until his death in 1905. His mother, Anna Morton, was daughter of noted physician and naturalist Samuel George Morton. Thomas Sr. and Anna had nine children–six sons and three daughters–of which Thomas Jr. was the sixth born. His older brother James Alan Montgomery (1866–1949) would become a noted Oriental scholar. At the age of nine, his family moved to the countryside near West Chester, Pennsylvania, where young Thomas soon began collecting field notes and bird specimens, amassing around 250 bird skins by age 15 and 450 by 17. He graduated from the Episcopal Academy in Philadelphia in 1889.

In 1889, Montgomery enrolled in the University of Pennsylvania, where he studied for two years before a summer trip to Europe inspired him to complete his education in Germany, enrolling in the University of Berlin in 1891 and completing a PhD in 1894 at the age of 21. His thesis was primarily supervised by Franz Eilhard Schulze, who worked largely with sponges and other invertebrates.

In 1901 Montgomery married Priscilla Braislin, and they had three sons. Priscilla Montgomery later worked as librarian of Woods Hole Oceanographic Institution.

== Career ==
Montgomery returned to America in early 1895 and spent three years as a researcher at the Wistar Institute in Philadelphia. During this period he spent consecutive summers working with Alexander Agassiz at his Rhode Island laboratory, the University of Pennsylvania marine laboratory at Sea Isle City, New Jersey, and at the Marine Biological Laboratory at Woods Hole, Massachusetts; the latter to which he would return nearly every summer for the rest of his life. In 1897 he joined the faculty of the University of Pennsylvania where he worked until 1903, then was professor at the University of Texas from 1903 to 1908 until returning to Pennsylvania where he worked as head of the zoology department until his death in 1912. He was a member of the American Society of Zoologists (president in 1910), American Association for the Advancement of Science, American Society of Naturalists, American Philosophical Society, Academy of Natural Sciences of Philadelphia, and the Texas Academy of Science (president in 1905). He was co-editor of the Journal of Morphology from 1908 to 1912.

=== Cytology ===
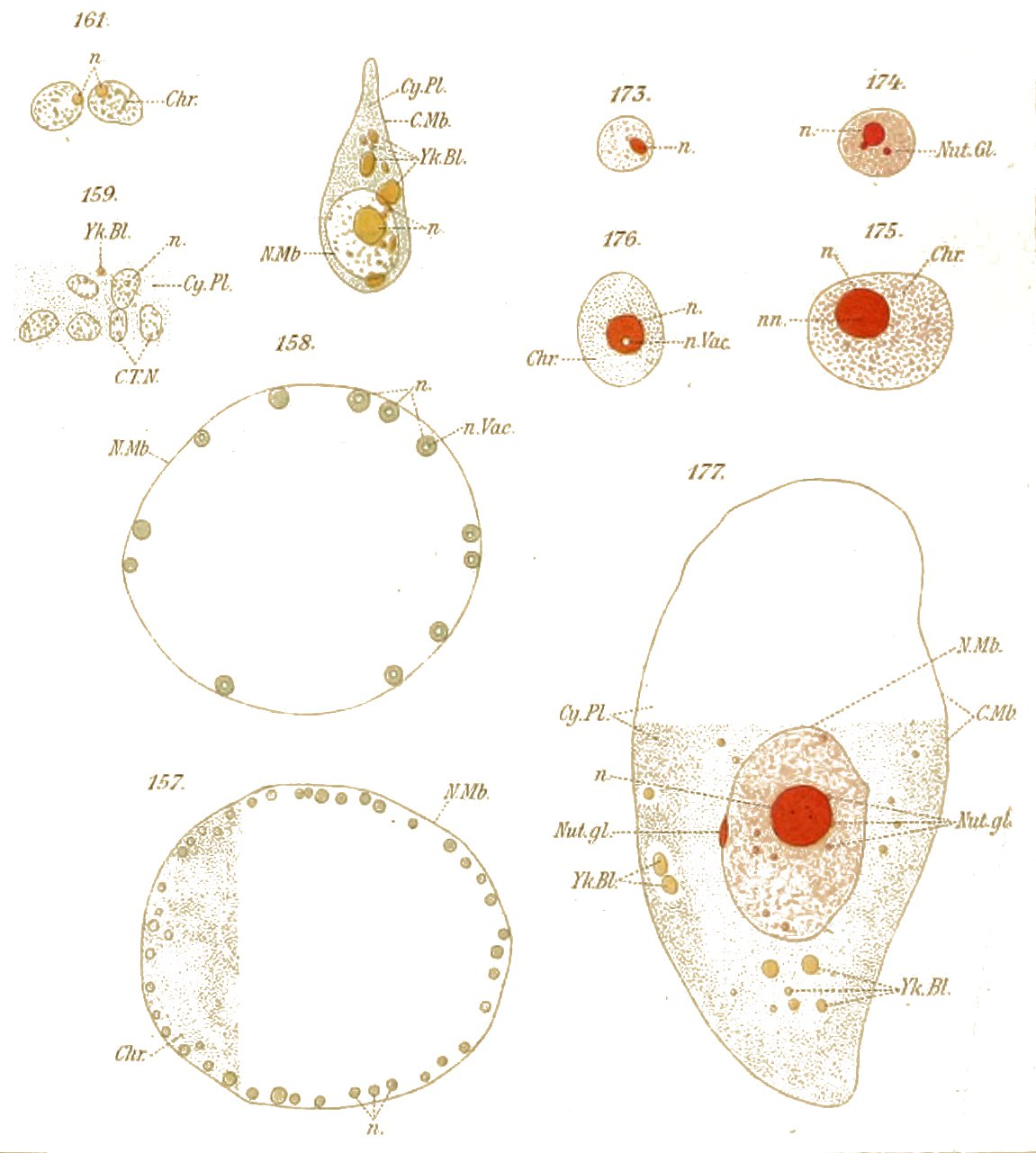
Montgomery's illustrations of structures in the eggs of Lineus gesserensis, a ribbon worm

Harrison published 25 papers on cell biology, primarily using insect cells. His most notable research includes early observations of the pairing of maternal and paternal chromosomes during cell division. He was first to propose that chromosomes play the dominant role in sex determination, although he rejected the idea that sex was determined by chromosomes alone, and some historians claim he was the first to propose the chromosome theory of inheritance, an idea widely credited to Walter Sutton and Theodor Boveri. He also detailed the morphology of the nucleolus, and observed that in some hemipteran insects the germ cells of males but not females contain odd numbers of chromosomes, which is now known to influence sex-determination, A resolution of the American Society of Zoologists read after his death stated "it would be impossible to write a text-book upon the role of the chromosomes in the determination of sex without referring to his crucial labors in this field."

=== Worms, spiders, and other invertebrates ===
Montgomery's earliest papers concerned ribbon worms (phylum Nemertea), a group on which he would write 10 papers. He also published 10 papers on horsehair worms (phylum Nematomorpha) and two on rotifers.

Montgomery wrote 14 scientific articles on spiders, and he was known to keep large amounts in his laboratory and home from which he recorded observations of courtship, mating, and other behaviors. He wrote on the taxonomy of wolf spiders (family Lycosidae), lynx spiders (Oxyopidae), and nursery web spiders (Pisauridae). In a 1909 paper detailing the anatomy and development of various organs in spiders he rejected a prevalent idea at the time that arachnids evolved from Merostomata (Note: The term Paleostraca was used at the time, a grouping which sometimes included trilobites with Merostomata) (a now obsolete group including horseshoe crabs and the extinct eurypterids) adapting to a terrestrial life, and proposed instead that the aquatic lifestyle of horseshoe crabs evolved from terrestrial ancestors.

=== Ornithology ===
During his youth, Montgomery made an impressive collection of bird specimens from the vicinity of West Chester, Pennsylvania, many of which are now preserved in the ornithology collection at the Academy of Natural Sciences of Drexel University. His collection consisted of 145 species collected from 1885 to 1891, and again from 1895 to 1897.

Montgomery is known for proposing the hypothesis that migratory behavior is negatively correlated with rates of evolutionary diversification, now known as "Montgomery's Rule". He published original research on the diet and foraging ecology of Long-eared Owl (Asio otus) and Short-eared Owl (A. flammeus). His book The Protection of Our Native Birds (1906) was an important early contribution to the bird conservation movement.

=== Other works ===
Montgomery also published on a variety of other topics including principles of animal classification and larval development of the red-backed salamander. His 1908 book, The Analysis of Racial Descent in Animals, described his ideas of classification. He contributed articles to Popular Science Monthly, (Note: see Wikisource:Thomas Harrison Montgomery Jr.) and also published a memoir of his father in 1905.

== Death ==
Montgomery was stricken with pneumonia on February 15, 1912, and died in a Philadelphia hospital on March 19, only a few days after his thirty-ninth birthday. The day of his death occurred on the opening day of the a celebration commemorating the centennial of Academy of Natural Sciences of Philadelphia: his final paper appeared as the first article of its centennial issue.
