= Bug-A-Salt =

Plastic gun-like device used to kill bugs

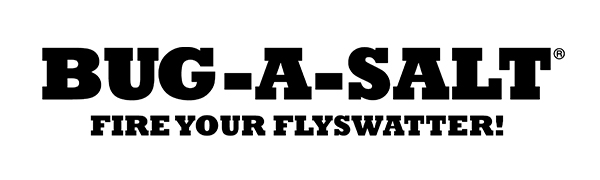
- Type: Fly-killing device
- Inventor: Lorenzo Maggiore
- Inception: 2012
- Manufacturer: Skell Inc
- Available: Yes
- Website: bugasalt.com

Bug-A-Salt is a brand of plastic airgun used to kill soft-bodied insects by shooting them with particles of table salt.

== Description ==
The Bug-A-Salt device uses granular table salt as non-toxic projectiles to kill insects. The plastic gun is capable of firing up to 80 shots of salt, which forms a conical spread pattern, similar to the blast pattern from a shotgun.

Biologist Michael Dickinson of the California Institute of Technology explains that flies cannot dodge the tiny salt particles, but will be protected by their arthropod exoskeleton and will only be stunned.

== History ==
Bug-A-Salt was invented by Lorenzo Maggiore and patented in 2012. He designed the device to kill houseflies at a distance, without creating a mess.

The Skell Inc company launched its Bug-A-Salt product in 2012 on the Indiegogo platform. At the close of Skell's crowd-funding campaign on September 11, 2012, the company had sold more than 21,400 units of the original model of the Bug-A-Salt salt gun.

== See also ==
- Fly-killing device
