= Blomefield baronets =

Baronetcy in the Baronetage of the United Kingdom

The Blomefield Baronetcy, of Attleborough in the County of Norfolk, is a title in the Baronetage of the United Kingdom. It was created on 14 November 1807 for Major-General Thomas Blomefield. His great-grandson (the title having descended from father to son), the fourth Baronet, was assistant secretary to the Board of Trade from 1901 to 1908. He was succeeded by his grandson, the fifth baronet, Sir Thomas Edward Peregrine Blomefield. The title is currently held by the latter's son, Sir Charles Blomefield, the sixth baronet, who succeeded in 1984. Sir Charles was a fine art specialist at Christie's.

== Blomefield baronets, of Attleborough (1807) ==
- Sir Thomas Blomefield, 1st Baronet (1744–1822)
- Sir Thomas William Blomefield, 2nd Baronet (1791–1858)
- Sir Thomas Eardley Wilmot Blomefield, 3rd Baronet (1820–1878)
- Sir Thomas Wilmot Peregrine Blomefield, CB, 4th Baronet (1848–1928)
- Sir Thomas Edward Peregrine Blomefield, 5th Baronet (1907–1984)
- Sir (Thomas) Charles Peregrine Blomefield, 6th Baronet (born 1948)

The heir apparent to the baronetcy is Thomas William Peregrine Blomefield (born 1983), only son of the 6th Baronet.

Baronetage of the United Kingdom
Preceded by Stanhope baronets	Blomefield baronets of Attleborough; 14 November 1807	Succeeded by Campbell baronets
