= Henry Montgomery =

Henry Montgomery may refer to:

- Henry Montgomery (bishop) (1847–1932), Anglican bishop and author
- Henry Montgomery (Liberal politician) (1863–1951), member of parliament for Bridgwater, 1906–1910
- Henry Montgomery (American politician) (1858–1917), South Dakota state representative, 1903–1906
- Henry Montgomery (minister) (1788–1865), Irish Presbyterian minister
- Sir Conyngham Montgomery, 1st Baronet (Henry Conyngham Montgomery, 1765–1830), member of parliament for Mitchell, 1807; County Donegal, 1808–1812; and Yarmouth, 1812–1816
- Sir Henry Conyngham Montgomery, 2nd Baronet (1803–1878), British administrator in India
- Robert Montgomery (actor) (Henry Montgomery Jr, 1904–1981), American actor, director, and producer
- Henry Montgomery, the plaintiff in the 2015 U.S. Supreme Court case of Montgomery v. Louisiana
