= Samuel Jay Crumbine =

American public health advocate (1862–1954)

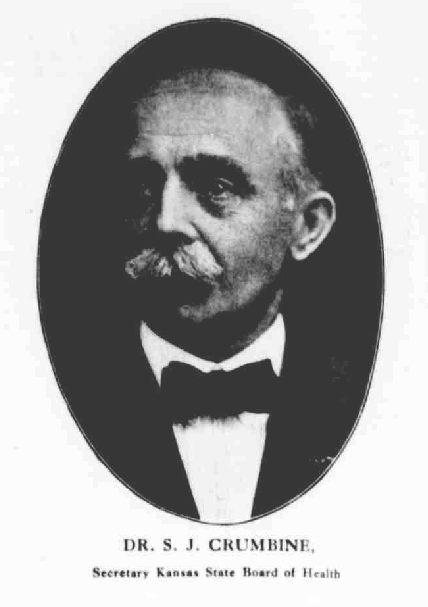
- Born: September 17, 1862; Emlenton, Pennsylvania
- Died: July 12, 1954 (aged 91); Jackson Heights, Queens, New York City
- Known for: Public health initiatives against communicable diseases
- Medical career
- Profession: Physician

Dr. Samuel Jay Crumbine (September 17, 1862 – July 12, 1954) was an American physician and public health official who introduced numerous initiatives to stop the spread of communicable diseases such as tuberculosis, mostly in the state of Kansas. He campaigned against the common drinking cup, the common towel, and spitting in public to prevent the spread of communicable diseases. He was also involved in the creation of the modern flyswatter with his "Swat the Fly" campaign, which was designed to stop the spread of diseases from flies and other insects.

== Early life and education ==
Crumbine was born on September 17, 1862, in Emlenton, Pennsylvania, to Sarah and Samuel J. Krumbine. His father died while imprisoned at Libby Prison in Richmond, Virginia during the Civil War. As a result, Crumbine and his mother lived with his maternal grandmother until he was eight, when he was sent off to a boarding school for orphans in Mercer, Pennsylvania. There, Crumbine began spelling his last name with a "C" instead of a "K." He graduated at sixteen and began working at a drug store in Sugar Grove, Pennsylvania, where he first began working with human medicine.

Following this, Crumbine relocated to Cincinnati and studied medicine under a local physician. Upon completion of his studies, he moved to Spearville, Kansas, and acquired a stake in a local drug store as well as continuing his medical practice. Soon after, he returned to Cincinnati and studied at the Cincinnati College of Medicine, returning to Spearville during breaks from school. He graduated top of his class in 1889.

== Career ==
=== Private practice in Dodge City ===
After graduating, Crumbine moved to Dodge City, Kansas, to set up his medical practice. Within the city, outbreaks of cholera and smallpox were common, as was distrust of science-based medicine. Early on in Dodge City, Crumbine made strides to prevent communicable disease outbreaks in the town. He convinced the local Harvey House diner to switch out communal milk pitchers with individual milk bottles, a move which would eventually be enacted across diners statewide. Additionally, Crumbine helped do away with pest houses within the town, instead advocating for the sick to stay home and for the rest of the population to get vaccinated. During this time, he also served two terms as the coroner of Ford County.

In 1900, Crumbine saved the life of the sick child of Ford County Attorney Edmond Madison, who held powerful connections within state Republican circles. As thanks, Madison convinced governor William Eugene Stanley to appoint him to the nine-man State Board of Health, which Crumbine accepted. By 1904, he was given the title of secretary by his peers on the board, meaning he was the overall director of the board. With the new position, Crumbine left Dodge City for Topeka, while still maintaining his private practice. However, by 1907, Crumbine abandoned his private practice to serve as secretary full-time.

=== Large-scale public health campaigns ===
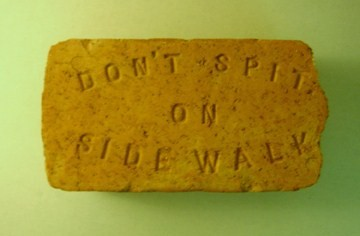
Brick with "Don't Spit on the Sidewalk" engraved, an example of one of Crumbine's initiatives against communicable disease

In 1906, Crumbine began an anti-fly campaign in order to combat the health hazards of the insect, famously using the term "swat the fly," a phrase Crumbine coined after attending a softball game. Soon after the campaign started, Frank Rose of Weir, Kansas, made "fly bats" out of leftover pieces of window screen which they attached to metersticks. Rose showed Crumbine his device, which Crumbine named the "fly swatter," a name which has since stuck. Fly swatters would soon be handed out at the Kansas State Fair, county fairs, and local anti-fly parades.

Catchy slogans like "swat the fly" became the modus operandi for Crumbine during his campaigns. Beyond that, Crumbine and his organization published monthly health bulletins to educate the public about health problems. He also utilized local news media to further spread the goals of his organization.

In 1907, Crumbine pursued a vigorous public health campaign throughout the state of Kansas, targeting communicable diseases such as tuberculosis. That year, after noticing tuberculosis patients spitting on the floors of trains and sharing drink cups without first rinsing them, Crumbine pursued various different campaigns against so-called "public health nuisances." He advocated for the outlawing of spitting in public, encouraging brickmakers to engrave "don't spit on the sidewalk" on their bricks. He further advocated for the removal of the common drinking cup on railroads and public buildings, as well as for the removal of reusable roller towels. On September 1, 1909, the Kansas Legislature passed a law banning the common drinking cup and on June 12, 1911, the Legislature passed a law banning the common roller towel in public places.

Around this same time, Crumbine began another of his crusades, this one against the food and drug industry. He regularly sent samples from various food and medicine products into research labs to be examined, and oftentimes hazardous materials were found. The Board of Health would alert the public of these findings through widely-circulated reports. These findings also led to the passage of the Kansas Pure Food and Drug Act of 1907, which came a year after the national Pure Food and Drug Act. The law allowed strong enforcement for the crime of mislabeling food and drug labels, resulting in heavy fines or jail time for offenders. As a result of his work, Crumbine was appointed head of the Association of Food and Drug Officials in 1915.

On December 9, 1910, the University of Kansas Board of Regents appointed Crumbine as the dean of the University of Kansas School of Medicine. At the time, the medical school had a poor reputation, and Crumbine was hired in the hopes that it would bolster it. Successes did occur under Crumbine, such as the school becoming the nation's first to offer postgraduate courses for public health officers. However, Crumbine had mixed success in boosting the school's prestige or financial support among state lawmakers. The political opposition that occurred eventually forced him to resign from the position in 1919.

In 1915, Crumbine took aim at infant mortality, creating one of the first state child hygiene divisions within the country. During the campaign, baby clinics were established and Little Mothers Leagues were established, designed to improve maternal education.

As executive officer, he oversaw efforts to keep Kansans educated and well aware of both the Spanish flu epidemic and preventative measures people can take to avoid the spread.

=== Later career ===
In 1923, Crumbine became the center of controversy when Jonathan M. Davis took over the position of governor. Nearly immediately, Davis fired all members of the Board of Health except Crumbine and replaced them with loyalists. He then asked the new appointees to fire Crumbine, an action that they refused to do, leading Davis to personally call for Crumbine's resignation, which he did on June 5, 1923.

Soon after, he moved to New York City to serve as a head of the American Child Health Association, led by then-Secretary of Commerce Herbert Hoover. In 1925, he became the general executive of the Association. During his tenure, the Association surveyed the conditions of children's health in cities across the continental United States and Puerto Rico, as well as the state of school health programs. He retired to Jackson Heights when the Association disbanded in 1936. In his final years, he served as a consultant to the New York-based Paper Cup and Container Institute and the Save the Children Federation. In 1948, Crumbine wrote an autobiography titled Frontier Doctor, which was published through Dorrance Publishing Company.

Crumbine died on July 12, 1954 due to complications from a brief illness.

== Legacy ==
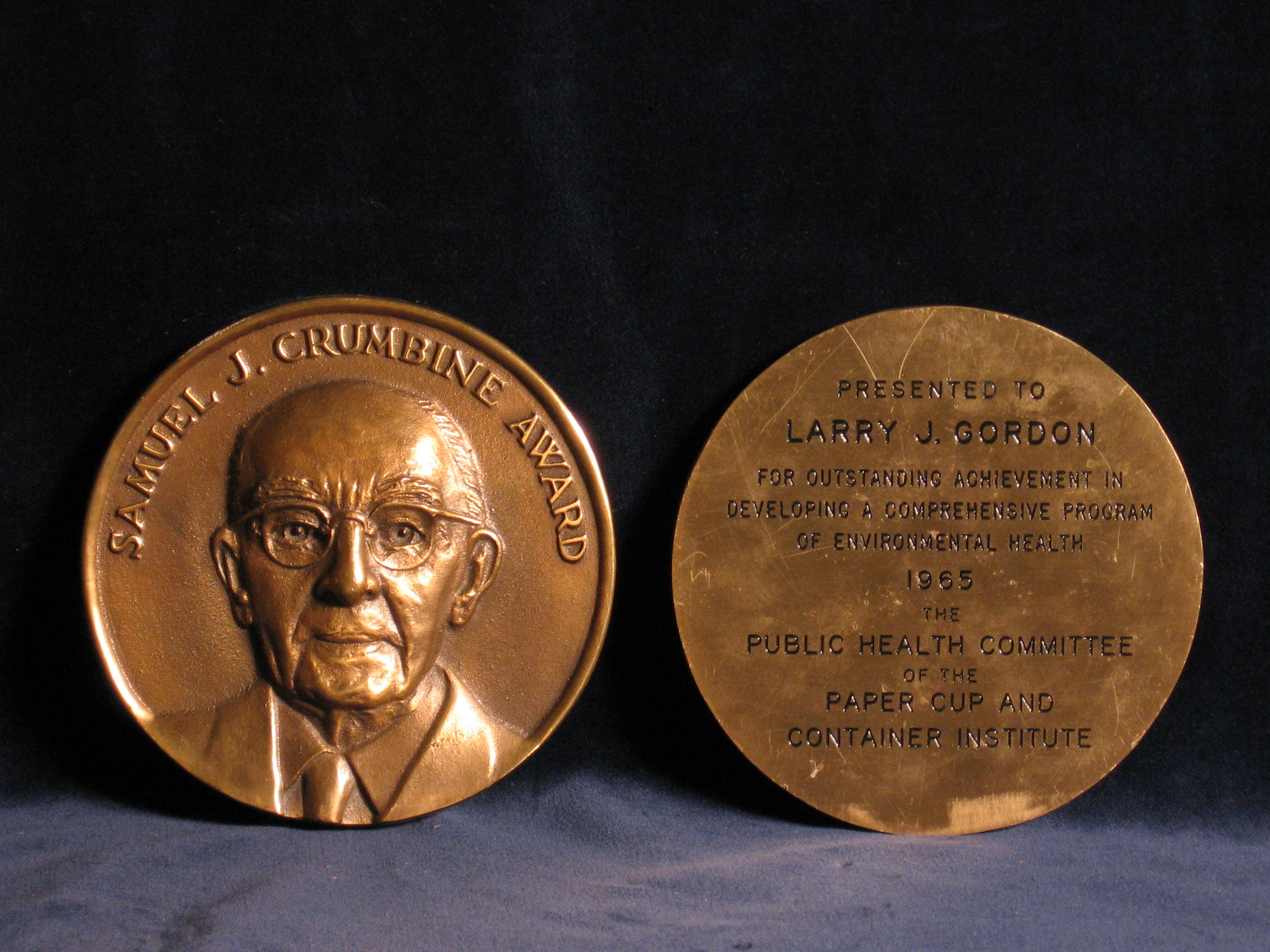
The Crumbine Award, awarded for excellence in public health

In 1955, the Crumbine Award was established by the Kansas Public Health Association in honor of him. The award sought to recognize individuals for their contributions to the field of public health. At present, the award is given to local government organizations responsible for food protection by a consortium of organizations concerned with consumer protection.

He was also the model for the character of Doc Adams on the television show Gunsmoke, played by fellow Kansan Milburn Stone. In 2017, a statue of Crumbine was erected at the offices of the Kansas Health Institute in downtown Topeka.

== Personal life ==
In 1889, Crumbine married Katherine Zuercher, whom he met in Cincinnati. With her, he had two daughters, Warren and Violet.
