= Sir Edward Buller, 1st Baronet =

Vice-Admiral Sir Edward Buller Bt
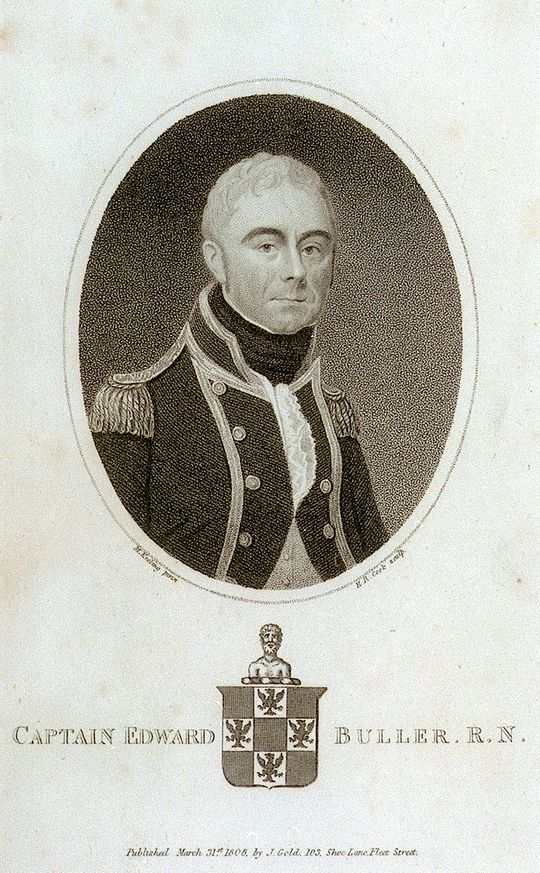
- Born: 24 December 1764; Admiralty House, Whitehall, Westminster
- Died: 15 April 1824 (aged 59); Trenant Park, Cornwall
- Military career
- Allegiance: United Kingdom of Great Britain and Ireland
- Branch: Royal Navy
- Service years: 1777–1824
- Rank: Vice-Admiral
- Commands: HMS Chaser; HMS Brisk; HMS Dido; HMS Porcupine; HMS Adventure; HMS Crescent; HMS America; HMS Edgar; HMS Achille; HMS Malta
- Conflicts: American Revolutionary War; Battle of Ushant; Battle of Cuddalore; French Revolutionary Wars; Capitulation of Saldanha Bay; Napoleonic Wars; Battle of Cape Finisterre

Sir Edward Buller, 1st Baronet (24 December 1764 – 15 April 1824) was an officer of the Royal Navy who served during the American War of Independence and the French Revolutionary and Napoleonic Wars.

Buller was born into a prominent West country family in 1764 and began his naval career twelve years later, serving with Lord Mulgrave during the American War of Independence. He initially saw action at the Battle of Ushant in 1778, before travelling to the East Indies with Sir Edward Hughes and participating in several of the engagements with the Bailli de Suffren. Appointed to his first command during his time off India, Buller narrowly survived a hurricane and a hazardous journey back to Britain. He commanded a sloop off the North American coast after the end of the war, and received his promotion to post-captain in 1790. Buller spent the early years of the French Revolutionary Wars escorting convoys and serving on the Cape of Good Hope, before returning to Britain and spending some time ashore, and some time at sea commanding ships in the English Channel.

He embarked on a political career during the Peace of Amiens, being elected Member of Parliament for East Looe in 1802, a seat that had been controlled by the Buller family for a number of years, and which his father and brother had both previously represented. The outbreak of the Napoleonic Wars in 1803 led to Buller's return to active naval service, commanding HMS Malta in the blockade of the French and Spanish ports. He was with Sir Robert Calder's fleet at the Battle of Cape Finisterre in 1805, at times bearing the brunt of the fighting, and helping to capture two Spanish ships. He afterwards served in the Atlantic and the Mediterranean, taking part in several daring operations before ill health obliged him to return home. He was promoted to rear-admiral in 1808 and accepted a dockyard position the following year. He served in this role until 1812, when he was promoted to vice-admiral. He received no further active employment from the navy, though he continued his political career, representing East Looe continually until 1820. He was also recorder for the borough from 1807 until his death in 1824 at the age of 59.

== Early life ==
Edward Buller was born in Admiralty House, Whitehall, Westminster on 24 December 1764. He was the second son of John Buller and his wife Mary, daughter of Sir John St Aubyn, 3rd Bt. The Bullers were a prominent family in Cornwall and Devon, and Edward's father was Member of Parliament for East Looe, a Lord of the Admiralty and later a Lord of the Treasury. Edward was sent to be educated at Westminster School in 1774, and jointed the navy in 1777, at the age of 12. He became a midshipman aboard Lord Mulgrave's 74-gun HMS Courageux, and took part in the Battle of Ushant on 27 July 1788. Buller received his commission as lieutenant in 1782 and joined the 64-gun HMS Sceptre under Captain Samuel Graves. The Sceptre went out to the East Indies as part of Sir Edward Hughes' fleet, and Buller saw action at most of the subsequent engagements between Hughes and the Bailli de Suffren, being wounded during one of them.

Acquitting himself well under fire, Buller was promoted to master and commander on 26 April 1783 and given command of the 18-gun sloop HMS Chaser. Chaser was present at the Battle of Cuddalore in June, and was at sea off the Coromandel Coast in November when she became caught in a great hurricane that swept the area. For some time it was feared by those on shore at Madras and Bombay that Chaser had foundered with the loss of all aboard, but Buller had managed through skilful seamanship to navigate the Gulf of Mannar, a passage previously thought unsafe for navigation, and so survive the storm. Soon after this Buller sailed the Chaser back to Britain, a passage made hazardous by her worn out state, but she arrived safely, whereupon Buller paid her off.

== North America ==
Buller was then appointed to command the 16-gun sloop HMS Brisk and sent to North America to combat smuggling operations there. He also used his time to make detailed surveys of the harbours and anchorages along the coast. In April 1789 news reached Buller that a large merchant vessel had been wrecked on the Isle of Sable, and that a number of the crew had survived, but were now stranded on the island at risk of starvation. Buller requested and was given permission to attempt a rescue mission, and despite the risk involved, anchored the Brisk off the shore and for three days attempted a landing, hampered by the sandbanks and shoals. Despite firing signal guns, no sign of any shipwrecked men could be found and after realising that the initial reports were probably groundless, Buller returned to Halifax.

== French Revolutionary Wars ==
Promotion to post-captain came on 19 July 1790, with an appointment to command the 28-gun HMS Dido. Buller returned to Britain and paid her off at the end of the year, and was given command of the 24-gun HMS Porcupine in 1792. He served in the English Channel, before being transferred to take command of the 44-gun HMS Adventure. While escorting a convoy of 13 Dutch merchants from Nova Scotia to Britain he was intercepted by a French squadron, and narrowly escaped. The merchants were released from his protection after being escorted past the danger, but were then promptly rounded up by British cruisers following the embargo placed on Dutch property. Buller was appointed to command HMS Crescent in 1795 and joined Captain William Essington's HMS Sceptre in escorting the India fleet to the Cape of Good Hope. During the voyage a Spanish squadron was spotted, consisting of a ship of the line and two frigates. Initially mistaking them for French ships Buller and Essington bore up to attack them, but broke off when the Spanish raised Spanish ensigns. The British captains were unaware that Spain had allied with France and was now at war with Britain, a fact known to their Spanish counterparts, and so unknowingly passed up the opportunity to attack the Spanish ships, which were heavily laden with specie from the Caribbean.

Arriving with the convoy at the Cape of Good Hope, Buller spent some time on the station and was present with Lord Keith's fleet when the Dutch squadron surrendered at Saldanha Bay. He was then compelled to return home to attend to personal matters, and transferred into the 64-gun HMS America for the voyage home. Unable to take up a sea-going command due to his personal affairs, Buller accepted command of the Sea Fencibles based from the Lyme to Cawsand Bay.

Buller returned to sea in 1799, taking command of the 74-gun HMS Edgar in the English Channel. He transferred to the 74-gun HMS Achille in April 1801, and took part in the blockade of the French ports of Brest and Rochefort.

== Napoleonic Wars ==
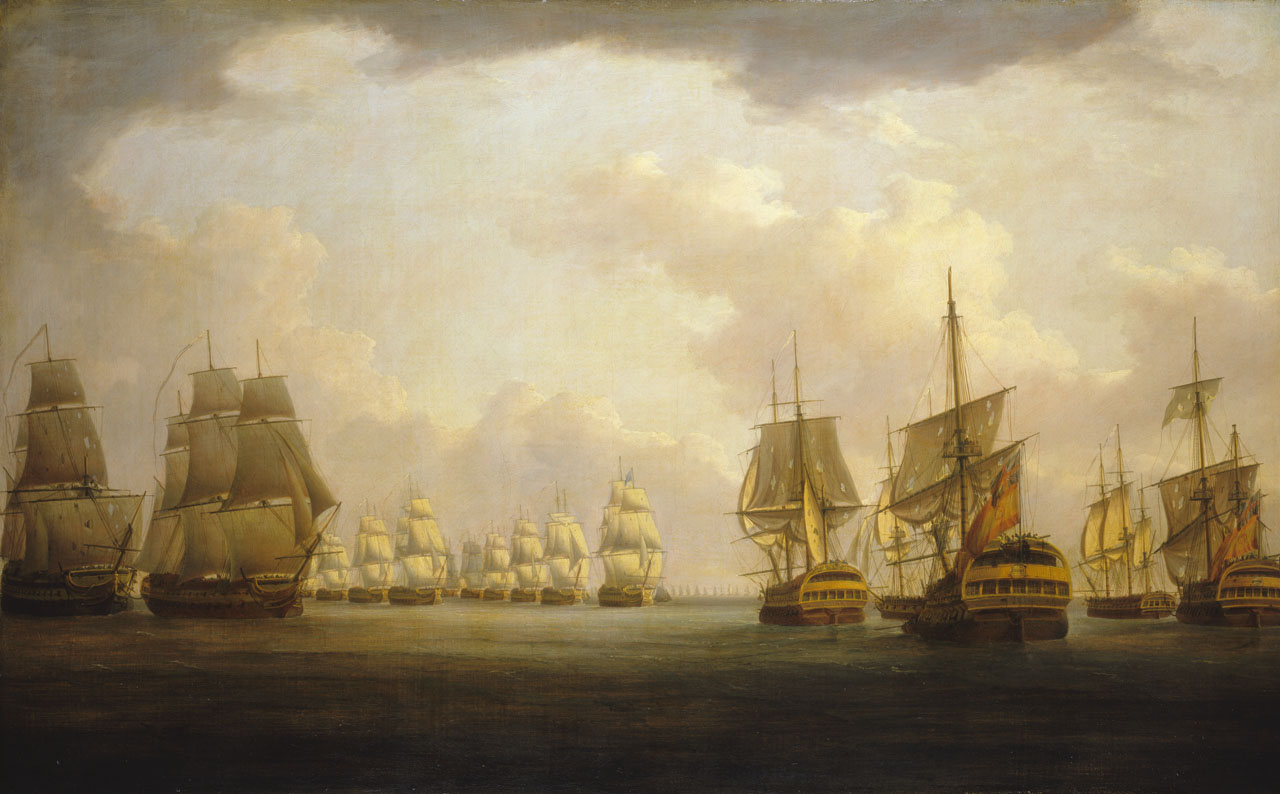
Admiral Sir Robert Calder's action off Cape Finisterre, 23 July 1805, by William Anderson

Buller went ashore during the Peace of Amiens, and was elected as Member of Parliament for East Looe in 1802, but with the outbreak of hostilities again in 1803, was appointed to the 80-gun HMS Malta and employed in the blockade of the French and Spanish Atlantic ports. He was made a Colonel of Marines on 28 April 1805, and was assigned to the fleet under Sir Robert Calder and took part in the Battle of Cape Finisterre on 22 July 1805. During the battle Buller found himself isolated from the rest of the fleet due to the patchy fog and failing light, and was surrounded by five enemy ships. He fought them off, forcing the Spanish 84-gun San Rafael to strike, and afterwards sending the Malta's boats to take possession of the Spanish 74-gun Firme. Malta had suffered considerably during the battle, having her mizzen top mast and mizzen sail yard shot away, and her mizzen and main masts damaged. Her rigging and sails were cut up, with her casualties amounting to five dead and forty wounded.

Buller remained with Malta into 1806, and in August was placed with Sir Thomas Louis' squadron to escort troops for a secret expedition. Before the force sailed news reached them that a French fleet had put to sea under Jérôme Bonaparte. Louis ordered the troops to be disembarked, and immediately set of in pursuit. Since Louis' assigned flagship, HMS Canopus was not yet ready to take his flag, Buller offered the Malta as a replacement, and Louis accepted. The British force was unable to bring Bonaparte's fleet to battle before they escaped back into Lorient, but on 27 September they encountered the 44-gun French frigate Président, returning from the Caribbean where she had cruised with L'Hermite's expedition. Président was chased down by the British squadron and forced to strike her colours. During the cruise Malta sprang her mainmast and was sent back to Britain by Louis to effect repairs.

The Malta, with Buller still in command, went to sea again in early January 1807 with orders to join Lord Collingwood's fleet in the Mediterranean. Collingwood placed Buller in command of the inshore squadron, where he continued to distinguish himself. In one particular instance he destroyed the beached transport Mary, which had run aground carrying stores for 25,000 troops, and which Buller burnt to prevent them falling into enemy hands. On another occasion while Malta was refitting at Gibraltar, Buller learnt that a Portuguese frigate had been wrecked on the Spanish coast. Buller at once went out and attempted to save the crew, working for several hours in pounding surf and twice being swept away, but refusing to leave until there were no more men to be saved. Perhaps because of these exertions, Buller became seriously ill with a fever, but recovered to resume his station. His health had been weakened however, and he applied to be superseded, returning to Britain later in 1807.

== Flag rank and later life ==
Buller was promoted to rear-admiral on 28 April 1808, and was created a baronet on 30 October 1809. He was appointed second in command at Plymouth in late 1809, holding the position until autumn 1812, during which time he was promoted to vice-admiral on 12 August 1812. While at Plymouth Captain Robert Corbet, a man notorious for his harsh discipline and, at times, tyrannical behaviour was appointed to a new ship, Africaine. The crew of Africaine at first refused to hear his commission, forcing the commander at Plymouth, Admiral William Young, to bring another ship alongside and run out her guns to prevent any mutinous actions. Buller was appointed to investigate the matter, and one day while sitting near Buller at table, Corbet was heard to remark 'The service will not be good for any thing until captains can flog their lieutenants if needful, as well as the ship's company; absolute power over all in the ship is the thing.' Buller replied 'Why then, admirals must in justice have the power of flogging captains - have a care, Corbet, and don't come under my orders, for I won't spare you!'

Buller received no further active employment after this. He continued to hold the seat of East Looe until 1820, and in 1807 succeeded his brother, John Buller as recorder for the borough. Sir Edward Buller died at his seat of Trenant Park on 15 April 1824 at the age of 59. The baronetcy became extinct upon his death.

== Family and issue ==
On 15 May 1790, in Halifax, Edward Buller married Gertrude Van Cortlandt (1772–1849), eldest daughter and heir of Loyalist Philippus Van Cortlandt, a descendant of Stephanus Van Cortlandt, the Schuyler family and the de Peyster family. They had one son, John St. Aubyn Buller, who died in infancy; and one daughter, Anna Maria Buller, who married James Drummond Elphinstone. James and Anna Maria's son became William Buller Fullerton Elphinstone, 15th Lord Elphinstone.

== Notes ==
Parliament of the United Kingdom
| Preceded by James Buller; Frederick William Buller | Member of Parliament for East Looe; 1802–1820; With: John Buller 1802–1807; David Vanderheyden 1807–1816; Thomas Potter Macqueen 1816–1820 | Succeeded by George Watson-Taylor; Thomas Potter Macqueen |
Baronetage of the United Kingdom
| New creation | Baronet (of Trenant Park, Cornwall); 1808–1824 | Extinct |
| Preceded by Campbell baronets | Buller baronets of Trenant Park; 3 October 1808 | Succeeded by Montgomery baronets |
