= James Montgomery =

James Montgomery may refer to:

== Arts, entertainment, and literature ==
- James Montgomery (composer) (born 1943), Canadian composer, performer, and arts administrator
- James Montgomery (playwright) (1878–1966), American playwright, screenwriter, producer, and actor
- James Montgomery (poet) (1771–1854), British hymnodist, poet and editor
- James Montgomery (singer) (born 1949), American blues singer and harmonica player, active since the early 1970s
- James Montgomery Bailey (1841–1894), American journalist
- James Montgomery Flagg (1877–1960), American artist and illustrator

== Clergy ==
- James Montgomery (Archdeacon of Raphoe), from 1783 to 1797
- James Montgomery (priest) (1818–1897), Provost of St Mary's Cathedral, Edinburgh
- James Alan Montgomery (1866–1949), American Episcopalian clergyman and Oriental scholar
- James Shera Montgomery (1864–1952), American Methodist minister
- James W. Montgomery (1921–2019), bishop of Chicago in the Episcopal church

== Politicians ==
- Sir James Montgomery, 4th Baronet (died 1694), Scottish politician
- Sir James Montgomery, 1st Baronet (1721–1803), Scottish politician and judge
- Sir James Montgomery, 2nd Baronet (1766–1839), Scottish peer, politician and lawyer
- James Montgomery (American politician) (1788–1878), American politician and physician

== Sportspeople ==
- James Montgomery (boxer) (1934–2015), Canadian Olympic boxer
- James Montgomery (footballer, born 1890) (1890–1960), English footballer
- James Montgomery (footballer, born 1994), English footballer
- Jimmy Montgomery (born 1943), English footballer

== Others ==
- James Montgomery (colonel) (1814–1871), American civil war colonel
- James D. Montgomery (attorney) (born 1932), African-American civil rights attorney in Chicago and Trustee of the University of Illinois
- James D. Montgomery (economist) (born 1963), labor market economist at the University of Madison, Wisconsin

== In fiction ==
- James "Hunter" Montgomery, character on the television series Queer as Folk

== See also ==
- James Montgomerie (1755–1829), British Army officer and colonial administrator
- James Montgomrey (1811–1883), Brentford benefactor and timber mill owner
- Jim Montgomery (disambiguation)
