= Fly-killing device =

Device for trapping or killing flying insects

A fly-killing device is used for pest control of flying insects, such as houseflies, wasps, moths, gnats, and mosquitoes.

== Flyswatter ==
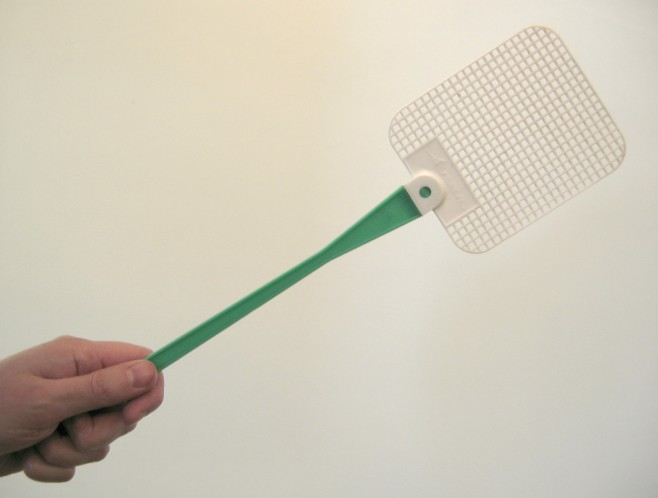
A typical flyswatter

A flyswatter (or fly-swat, fly swatter) usually consists of a small rectangular or round sheet of a lightweight, flexible, vented material (usually thin metallic, rubber, or plastic mesh) around 10 cm (4 in) across, attached to a handle about 30 to 60 cm (1 to 2 ft) long made of a lightweight material such as wire, wood, plastic, or metal. The venting or perforations minimize the disruption of air currents, which are detected by an insect and allow escape, and also reduce air resistance, making it easier to hit a fast-moving target.

A flyswatter is ideally lightweight and stiff, allowing quick acceleration to overcome the fast reaction time of the fly (six to ten times faster than a human), while also minimizing damage caused by hitting other objects. The flyswatter usually works by mechanically crushing the fly against a hard surface, after the user has waited for the fly to land somewhere. However, users can also injure or stun an airborne insect mid-flight by whipping the swatter through the air at an extreme speed.

=== History ===
The abeyance of insects by use of short horsetail staffs and fans is an ancient practice, dating back to the Egyptian pharaohs. The earliest flyswatters were in fact nothing more than some sort of striking surface attached to the end of a long stick. An early patent on a commercial flyswatter was issued in 1900 to a Union Army veteran from Decatur, Illinois named Robert R. Montgomery, who called it a fly-killer. Montgomery sold his patent to John L. Bennett, a wealthy inventor and industrialist who made further improvements on the design.

The origin of the name "flyswatter" comes from Dr. Samuel Crumbine, a member of the Kansas board of health, who wanted to raise public awareness of the health issues caused by flies. He was inspired by a chant at a local Topeka softball game: "swat the ball". In a health bulletin published soon afterwards, he exhorted Kansans to "swat the fly". In response, a schoolteacher named Frank H. Rose created the "fly bat", a device consisting of a yardstick attached to a piece of screen, which Crumbine named "the flyswatter".

== Fly gun ==
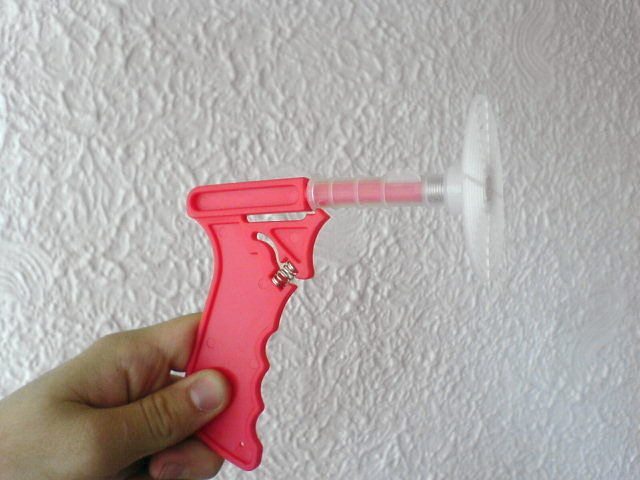
A fly gun

The fly gun (or flygun), a derivative of the flyswatter, uses a spring-loaded plastic projectile to mechanically "swat" flies. Mounted on the projectile is a perforated circular disk, which, according to advertising copy, "won't splat the fly". Several similar products are sold, mostly as toys or novelty items, although some maintain their use as traditional fly swatters.

Another gun-like design consists of a pair of mesh sheets spring loaded to "clap" together when a trigger is pulled, squashing the fly between them. In contrast to the traditional flyswatter, such a design can only be used on an insect in mid-air.

Bug-A-Salt is the brand of plastic gun used to kill soft-bodied insects by shooting them with particles of table salt.

== Fly bottle ==
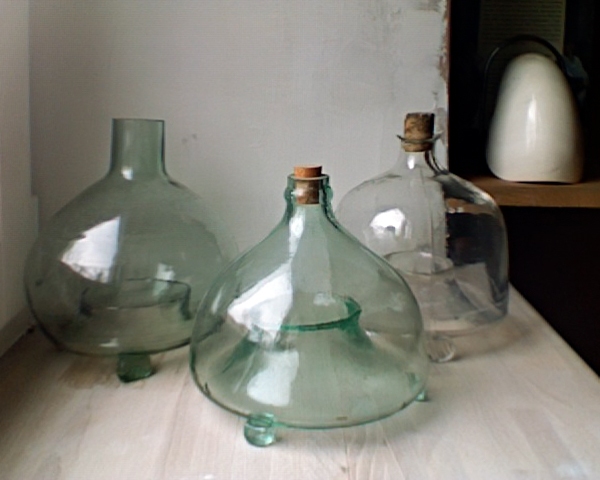
Three fly bottles from Central Europe, beginning of the 20th century

A fly bottle or glass flytrap is a passive trap for flying insects. In the Far East, it is a large bottle of clear glass with a black metal top with a hole in the middle. An odorous bait, such as pieces of meat, is placed in the bottom of the bottle. Flies enter the bottle in search of food and are then unable to escape because their phototaxis behavior leads them anywhere in the bottle except to the darker top where the entry hole is.

A European fly bottle is more conical, with small feet that raise it to 1.25 cm (0.5 in), with a trough about a 2.5 cm (1 in) wide and deep that runs inside the bottle all around the central opening at the bottom of the container. In use, the bottle is stood on a plate and some sugar is sprinkled on the plate to attract flies, who eventually fly up into the bottle. The trough is filled with beer or vinegar, into which the flies fall and drown. In the past, the trough was sometimes filled with a dangerous mixture of milk, water, and arsenic or mercury chloride.

McPhail bottle traps being used in a pest surveillance program

Variants of these bottles are the agricultural fly traps used to fight the Mediterranean fruit fly and the olive fly, which have been in use since the 1930s. They are smaller, without feet, and the glass is thicker for rough outdoor usage, often involving suspension in a tree or bush. Modern versions of this device are often made of plastic, and can be purchased in some hardware stores. They can also be improvised from disposable plastic drink bottles.

== Disposable fly traps ==
Disposable fly traps are small "use and throw away" fly traps. The traps are disposable plastic bags containing some attractant, generally made of flavouring agents that are non-toxic. Water and direct sunlight are used to activate the attractant, which emits a smell to lure the flies. Insects enter the trap and drown in the water inside.

== Glue board ==
A glue board is a capture device with a strong adhesive. A small card covered in sticky adhesive is situated in an enclosure so that when the flies come into contact with it, they stick to it and die. A reusable glue board may be renewed through the use of vegetable oil, and then the removal of the oil with dish-washing detergent and a rinse of water. Alternatively, the card is disposed of and completely replaced periodically.

== Flypaper ==
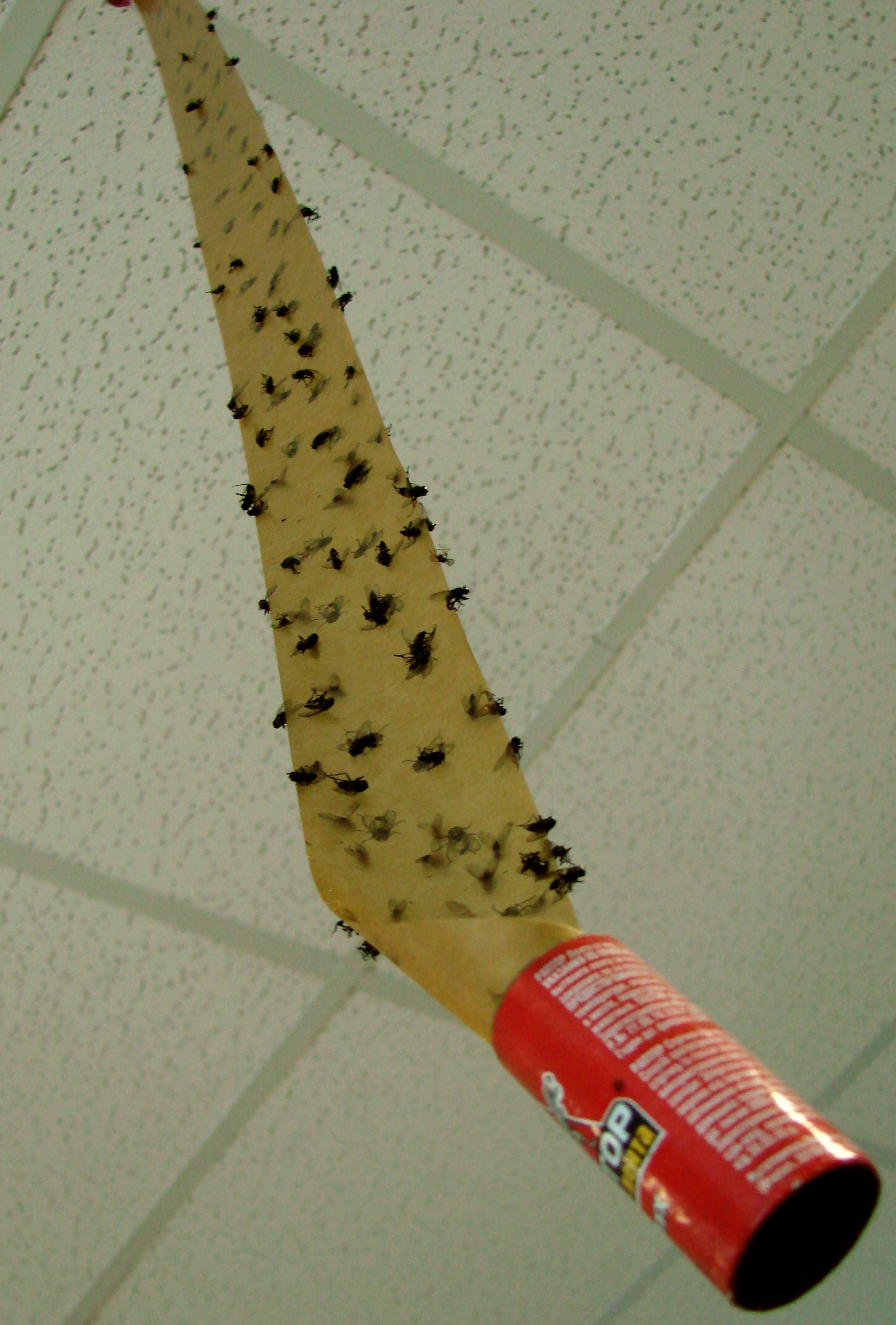
Fly capture tape

Flypaper (also known as a fly ribbon, fly strip, fly capture tape, fly tape, or fly catcher) is a fly-killing device made of paper coated with a sweetly fragrant, but extremely sticky and sometimes poisonous substance that traps flies and other flying insects when they land upon it. Fly paper is considered a pest control device, and is subject to regulation in many countries. In the United States of America, the device may be subject to the Federal Insecticide, Fungicide, and Rodenticide Act.

=== Toxicity ===
The poisons used in some types of flypaper could potentially be toxic to humans and other animals. Historically, metallic arsenic (a well-known toxin to humans) was used in flypaper. Arsenic extracted by soaking flypaper in water has been used by several convicted murderers, among them Lyda Southard, Frederick Seddon, Florence Maybrick, and the Angel Makers of Nagyrév.

Most modern brands of flypaper contain no poison, but only a non-toxic adhesive such as rosin.

=== Effectiveness ===
Flypaper is as effective as many other methods involving insecticides or bug zappers. However, a twisted strip of flypaper hanging from the ceiling is considered by many to be aesthetically less acceptable than some other methods, and so flypaper is not as commonly used as it once was. Some formulas for flypaper also have a slight but potentially disagreeable odor. Handling and disposing of flypaper can be awkward because it is so sticky, though vegetable oil can commonly be used to remove the adhesive. Flypaper loses its effectiveness over time when it dries up or becomes covered with dust, and it should be replaced regularly. Consideration should also be given to positioning, as it may be more or less effective in different areas of a room.

== Bug vacuum ==
A bug vacuum (bug vac, aspirator, or suck-a-bug) is a type of small but powerful portable vacuum cleaner, usually with internal batteries. The motor starts quickly and generates strong suction, trapping the flying insect inside the device. The insect may be captured on an adhesive internal surface, or simply held inside the device until it dehydrates and dies.

Some bug vacuums feature non-lethal designs which keep trapped insects inside, but do not otherwise harm them, allowing their later release. These devices are popular with entomologists and persons who wish to avoid the killing of insects.

A related device powered by mouth suction is called a pooter, and is used by entomologists and students to capture small organisms for study.

== Fan-based trap ==
This design uses a continuously running electric fan to suck in flying insects (especially mosquitos and gnats, which are weak fliers), which are then trapped by a fine mesh grid or bag. Unable to escape the constant airflow, the insects quickly dehydrate and die. Some variant designs use carbon dioxide, ultraviolet light, or chemical scent to attract insects to the trap. Other designs rely on the natural carbon dioxide or scents emitted by people, pets, or livestock to attract pests, and simply collect flying insects as they wander close enough to be sucked in. In addition, the continuous breeze produced by a common electric fan has been found to discourage mosquitos from landing and biting, even without trapping or killing the insects.

== Bug zapper ==
A bug zapper electric grid (fly zapper) kills insects by electrocution from high voltage on adjacent metallic grids. Bug zappers are generally small appliances intended for use in a fixed location, as distinguished from hand held electric flyswatters.

== Electric flyswatter ==
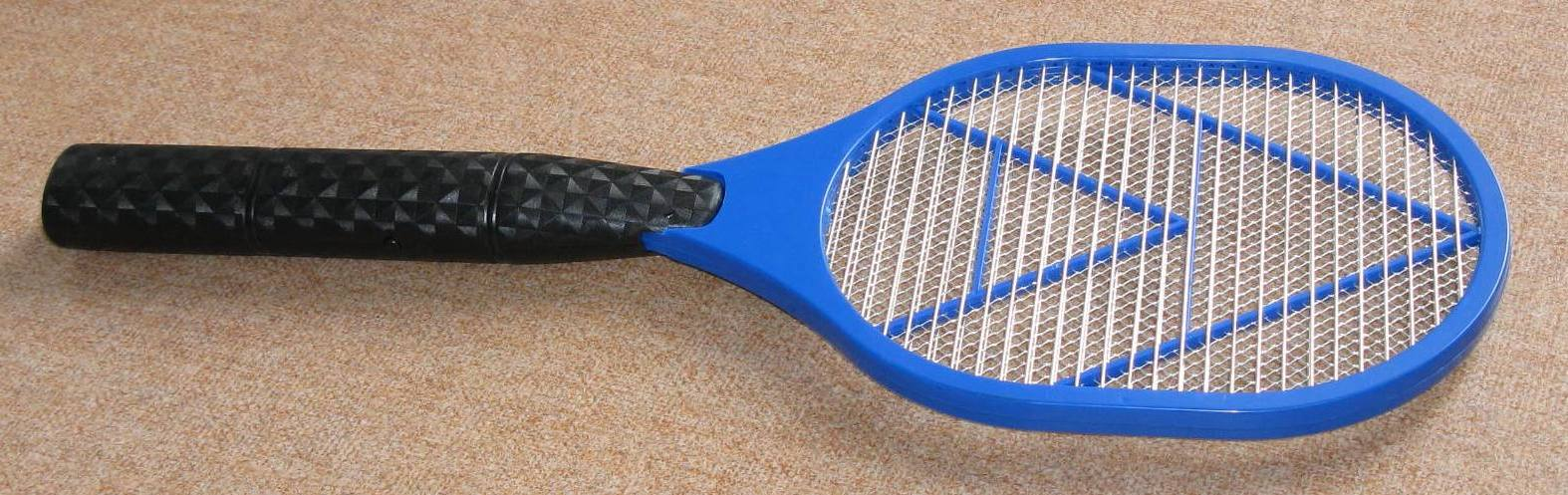
An electric flyswatter

An electric flyswatter (sometimes called mosquito bat, racket zapper, or zap racket) is a battery-powered, handheld bug zapper that resembles a tennis racket invented by Tsao-i Shih in 1996. The handle contains a battery-powered high-voltage generator. The circuit is a minimalist self-oscillating voltage booster, that is small, low-cost, composed of very few components, and continuing to operate when the battery is depleted to a fraction of its original voltage, a so-called joule thief circuit.

The flyswatter generates a voltage of between 500 and 3,000 volts (V) when a button switch is held down; the voltage is applied between two grid or mesh electrodes. When the body of a fly bridges the gap between the electrodes, a current passes through the fly. A capacitor attached to the electrodes discharges during the spark, and this initial discharge usually stuns or kills the fly. If the button is kept depressed, the continuous current will rapidly kill and incinerate a small fly.

In some swatters, an inner expanded metal or wire grid mesh is sandwiched between two outer arrays of rods, designed so that fingers are not able to poke through and bridge the electrodes, while small insects can. Other swatters have an array of rods, with high voltage between any rod and its neighbor.

Electric flyswatters are an easy fire risk if left on overnight, irritation and cheap faulty parts if bought from budget websites or shops.

Most electric flyswatters conform to electrical safety standards for humans:

- A limit on the net charge stored in the capacitor: A discharge of less than 45 microcoulombs (μC) is considered safe, even in the unlikely scenario that the current from a flyswatter would be flowing from one arm to the other arm, partly through the heart. For example, the capacitor of a 1000 V flyswatter should be less than 45 nanofarads (nF). Due to this precaution for human safety, the initial shock is usually inadequate to kill larger insects, but will still stun them for long enough that they can be disposed of.
- A limit on the current after the initial discharge: The maximal continuous current of most flyswatters is less than 5 milliamperes (mA). This current is safe, even when flowing from one arm to the other arm of a human.

An advantage over conventional flyswatters is that the electrical models do not have to crush the fly against a surface to kill it, avoiding the smeared mess this can create. Insects on a surface will start flying as the swatter approaches, so it can strike them.

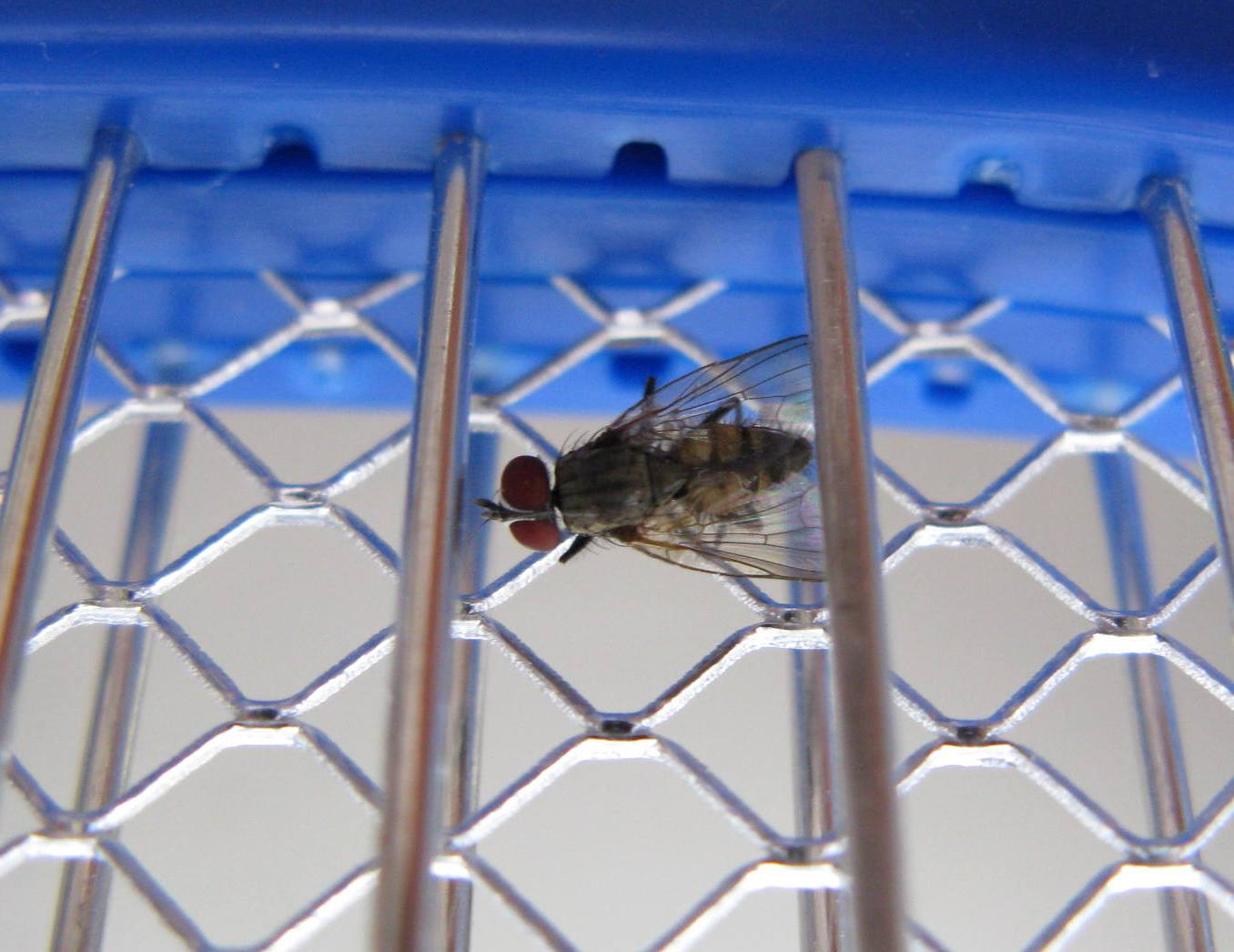
Three layer grid close up: mesh and rods oppositely charged

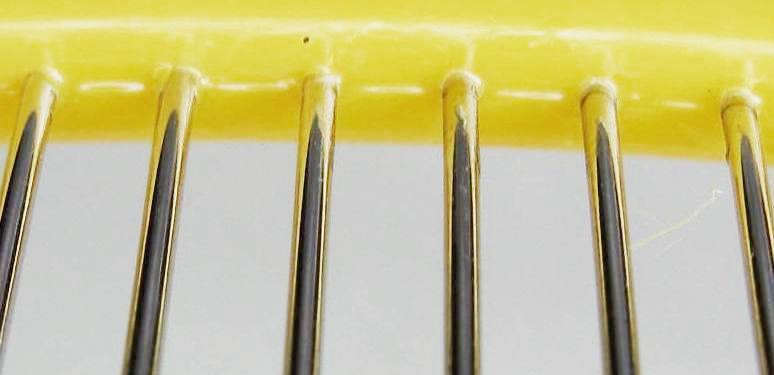
Closeup view of single layer grid: odd and even rods oppositely charged

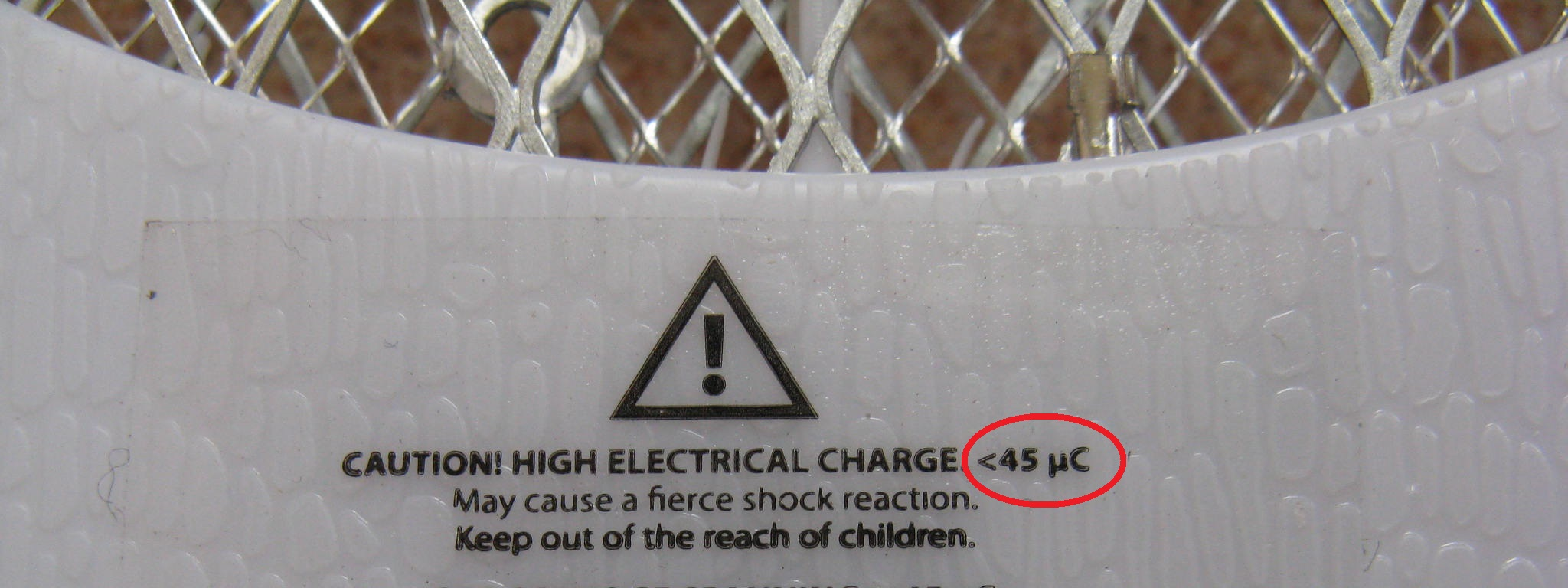
Maximum charge: 45 μC

== See also ==
- Fly-whisk
- Fly spray
- Mosquito control
- Venus flytrap
- Sundew plant
- Pitcher plant
- Carnivorous plant
