= David Montgomery =

David Montgomery may refer to:

- David Montgomery (historian) (1927–2011), American historian at Yale
- David Montgomery, 2nd Viscount Montgomery of Alamein (1928–2020), British politician
- David Montgomery (newspaper executive) (born 1948), British newspaper executive
- David Montgomery (baseball) (1946–2019), American president and CEO of the Philadelphia Phillies
- David Montgomery (American football) (born 1997), American football player
- David Henry Montgomery (1837–1928), American author of history books
- David R. Montgomery (born 1961), American professor of earth and space sciences, University of Washington
- David C. Montgomery (1870–1917), American comedic actor with Fred Stone
- David C. Montgomery (1936–2024), American physicist
- David Montgomery (photographer) (born 1937), American portrait photographer
- David Montgomery (cyclist) (born 1995), Irish professional cyclist
