= Admiral Montgomery =

Admiral Montgomery may refer to:

- Sir Alexander Montgomery, 3rd Baronet (1807–1888), British Royan Navy admiral
- Alfred E. Montgomery (1891–1961), U.S. Navy vice admiral
- Charles Montgomery (Royal Navy officer) (born 1955), British Royal Navy vice admiral
- John B. Montgomery (1794–1872), U.S. Navy rear admiral

== See also ==
- John Eglinton Montgomerie (1825–1902), British Royan Navy admiral
- Robert Archibald James Montgomerie (1855–1908), British Royal Navy rear admiral
