= Frank Montgomery =

Frank Montgomery may refer to:

- Frank Montgomery (director) (1870–1944), American film actor and director
- Frank Montgomery (footballer), Northern Irish footballer
- Frank A. Montgomery (1830–1903), American Army officer
- Frank Ulrich Montgomery, German radiologist
- Frank Montgomery (rugby union)

== See also ==
- Frank Montgomery School, in England
