= General Montgomery (disambiguation) =

Bernard Montgomery (1887–1976) was a British Army general who commanded British forces in World War II. General Montgomery may also refer to:

- Alexander Montgomery (died 1785) (c. 1721—1785), Irish General of Volunteers
- Richard Mattern Montgomery (1911–1987), U.S. Air Force lieutenant general
- Richard Montgomery (1738–1775), American army officer
- Robert Montgomery (British Army officer) (1848–1931), British Army major general
- Sonny Montgomery (1920–2006), Mississippi National Guard major general in World War II
- Thomas M. Montgomery (born 1941), U.S. Army lieutenant general
- William Montgomery (Pennsylvania soldier) (1736–1816), Pennsylvania Militia major general
- William Reading Montgomery (1801–1871), Union Army brigadier general

== See also ==
- Archibald Montgomery-Massingberd (1871–1947), British Army general
- Archibald Montgomerie, 11th Earl of Eglinton (1726–1796), British Army general
- James Montgomerie (1755–1829), British Army lieutenant general
- Attorney General Montgomery (disambiguation)
