= Robert Montgomerie =

Robert Montgomerie may refer to:

- Robert Montgomerie (fencer) (1880–1939), British Olympic fencer
- Robert Montgomerie (cricketer) (1937–2017), English cricketer
- Robert Montgomerie (novelist), British novelist
- Robert Montgomerie (bishop), Scottish archbishop of Glasgow
- Robert Archibald James Montgomerie (1855–1908), British Royal Navy officer

== See also ==
- Robert Montgomery (disambiguation)
