= Campbell baronets of Succoth (1808) =

Escutcheon of the Campbell baronets of Succoth

The Campbell baronetcy, of Succoth in the County of Dumbarton, was created in the Baronetage of the United Kingdom on 17 September 1808 for Ilay Campbell, Lord President of the Court of Session and Lord Justice General between 1789 and 1808 under the judicial title Lord Succoth. The second Baronet was a Senator of the College of Justice, also under the judicial title Lord Succoth. The third Baronet sat as Member of Parliament for Argyllshire.

The title became extinct on the death of the seventh Baronet in 2017.

== Campbell baronets, of Succoth (1808) ==
- Sir Ilay Campbell, 1st Baronet (1734–1823)
- Sir Archibald Campbell, 2nd Baronet (1769–1846)
- Sir Archibald Islay Campbell, 3rd Baronet (1825–1866)
- Sir George Campbell, 4th Baronet (1829–1874)
- Sir Archibald Spencer Lindsey Campbell, 5th Baronet (1852–1941)
- Sir George Ilay Campbell, 6th Baronet (1894–1967)
- Sir Ilay Mark Campbell, 7th Baronet (1927–2017)

== Extended family ==
John Campbell, son of the second Baronet and father of the third and fourth Baronets, sat as Member of Parliament for Dunbartonshire.

== Notes ==
Baronetage of the United Kingdom
Preceded by Blomefield baronets	Campbell baronets of Succoth; 17 September 1808	Succeeded by Buller baronets
