= Thomas Blomefield =

British Army general (1744–1822)

General Sir Thomas Blomefield, 1st Baronet (16 June 1744 – 24 August 1822), of Attleborough, Norfolk, was colonel-commandant royal artillery, to whose untiring labours as Inspector of Artillery and Superintendent of the Royal Foundries that the progress of the British artillery during the Napoleonic Wars was largely due.

== Life ==
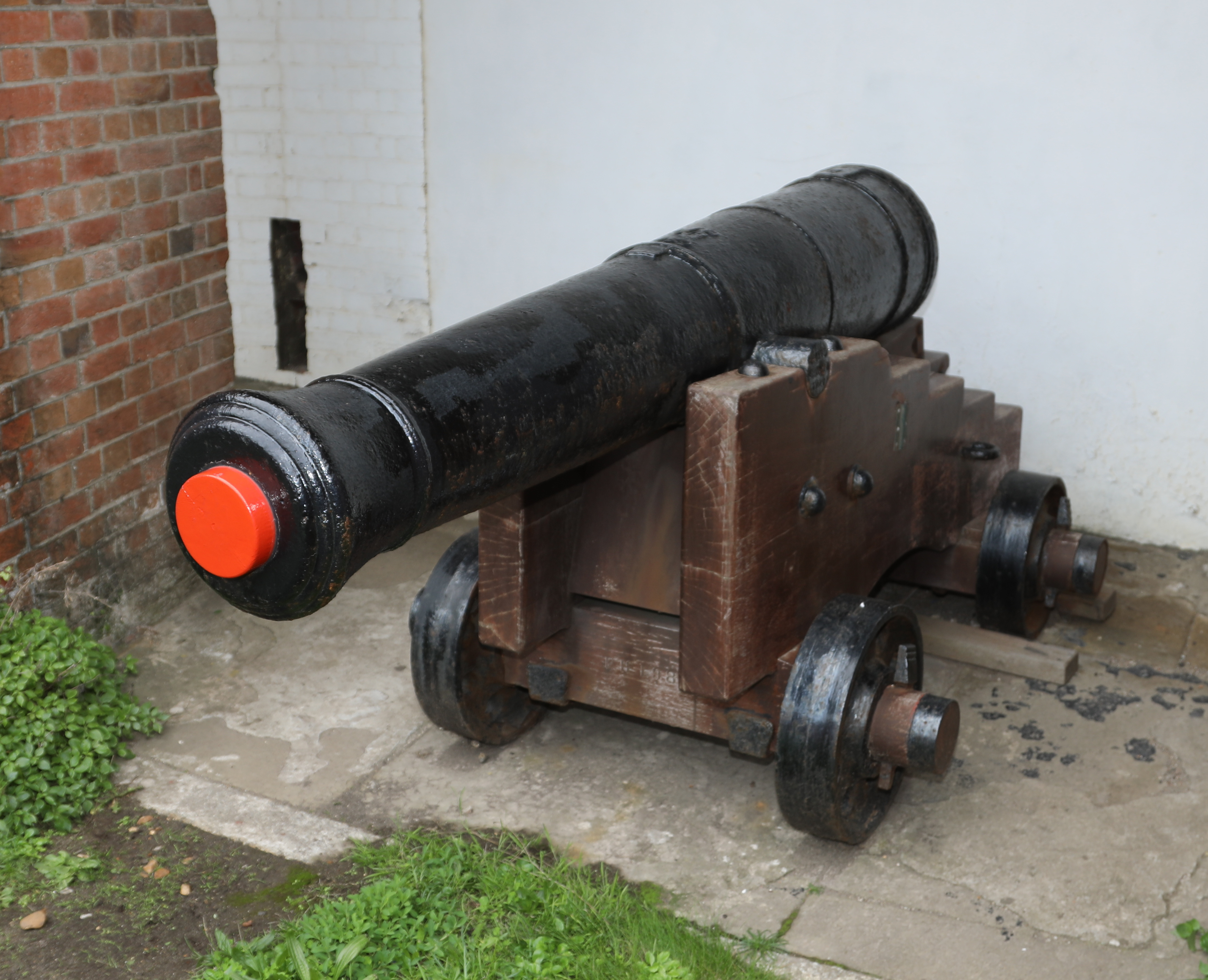
A 9 pounder canon built to Blomefield's design

He was the son of Reverend Thomas Blomefield and Mary Matthews. When he was 11 years old his father sent Thomas to sea on HMS Cambridge under Sir Peircy Brett, who was a close friend of the Rev. Blomefield. Thomas's naval career was short lived; in February 1758 he enrolled as a cadet at the Royal Military Academy, Woolwich.

He was a talented student, and passed out as a lieutenant-fireworker eleven months later at age 15. He commanded a bomb ketch at the bombardment of Le Havre and joined Admiral Edward Hawke's fleet at Quiberon.

Blomefield saw combat in the West Indies and Florida and served as personal aide-de-camp to General Conway, who was then acting Master General of the Ordnance. In 1771 Conway's successor, Lord Townshend, retained Blomefield as his aide. He resigned the position to serve in the American Revolutionary War. He was brigade-major to Brigadier William Phillips and was wounded in the head at the Battle of Saratoga. When he recovered he returned to his duties as aide to the Master General of Ordnance.

In 1780, he was appointed Inspector of Artillery and Superintendent of the Royal Brass Foundry. Blomefield set himself to the task. He began by condemning 496 new artillery pieces, about a quarter of Britain's annual production, as unsuitable before they were sent to the army or the fleet.

He was entrusted with reorganisation of the Ordnance Department in 1783. At about this time he started to design artillery. Apparently he conducted his own experiments and used these to inform his designs. He was promoted to lieutenant-colonel in 1793, and colonel seven years later. He was promoted to major-general in 1803. He served as colonel-commandant of battalion in 1806. Blomefield was major-general of the artillery expedition to Copenhagen in 1807. He was created a Baronet "of Attleborough, in the County of Norfolk" on 14 November 1807.

The Royal Navy too conducted experiments. To enable new frigates to meet the American frigates on less unequal terms, in 1813 Cydnus and her sister Eurotas received medium 24-pounder guns and an increased complement of men. Cydnus's 24-pounders followed a Blomefield design and measured 7 ft. 6 in. in length while weighing about 40 cwt. (4,480 lbs.). The 24-pounders on Eurotas were to a design by Colonel William Congreve. During December 1813 and January 1814, Cyndus and Eurotas actually temporarily exchanged six 24-pounders, presumably to enable both vessels to test the designs against each other. Ultimately, the Royal Navy adopted Blomefield's design.

== Family ==
Blomefield married Elizabeth Wilmot, daughter of Sir John Eardley Wilmot and Sarah Rivett on 27 July 1788. They had a son Thomas-William who was born 4 March 1791.

== The Blomefield gun in contemporary use ==
Every Saturday, the Saluting Battery at the Upper Barracca Garden in Valletta, Malta, fires a noonday salute using an 1807 Blomefield 24-pounder gun.

== Citations ==
Baronetage of the United Kingdom
| New creation | Baronet (of Attleborough); 1807–1822 | Succeeded by Thomas Blomefield |
