= Ed Montgomery (musician) =

American author, motivational speaker, musical artist (born 1952)

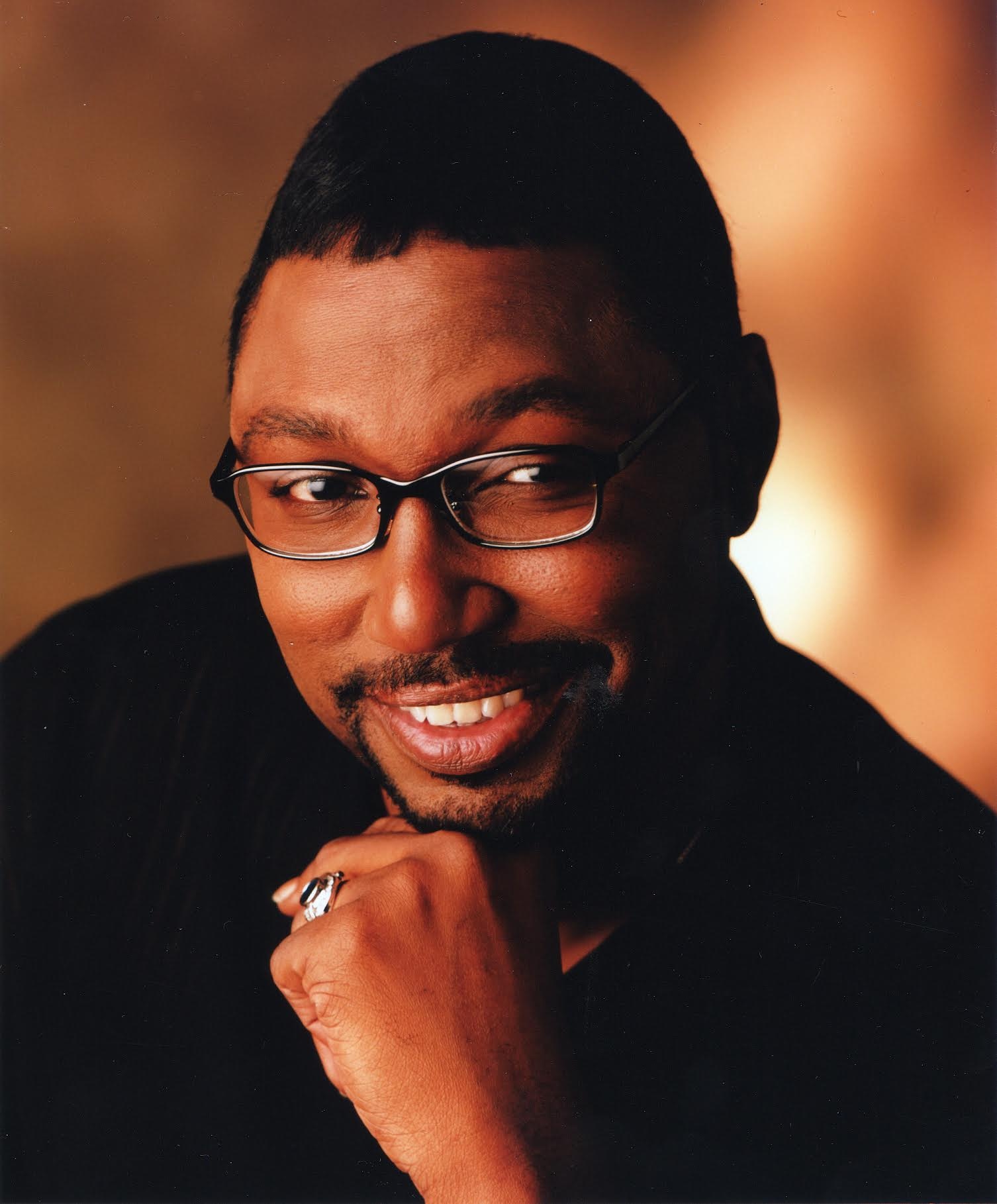

Background information
- Birth name: Edward Lee Montgomery
- Also known as: Dr. Ed Montgomery; Dr. Ed
- Born: February 1, 1952 (age 73); Cleveland, Ohio, United States
- Origin: Houston, Texas
- Genres: Gospel, traditional black gospel, urban contemporary gospel
- Occupation(s): Spiritual life strategist, author, motivational speaker, singer, songwriter, pianist
- Instrument(s): Vocals, singer-songwriter, piano
- Years active: 2000–present
- Labels: Ablife
- Website: edmontgomery.net

Edward Lee "Ed" Montgomery (born February 1, 1952) is an American author, motivational speaker, gospel musician, and pianist, who is the founder and pastor of Abundant Life Center For Dynamic Living in Houston, Texas.

He started his music career in 2000 with the release of, Show Me the Money, by his own label, Ablife Records. The album, I Still Believe, was released in 2000, again by Ablife Records. This album would chart on two Billboard charts Gospel Albums and Independent Albums. His 2002 album, Total Live Experience, was released by Ablife Records. The album charted on the two aforementioned charts, along with placing on the Heatseekers Albums chart.

Ed Montgomery is also the author of several books, including Heaven in Your Heart: And in Your Pocket Too (Charisma Media, December 1998), Breaking the Spirit of Poverty (Charisma House, March 1999), and When Heaven Is Silent (Creation House, June 2002), all available on Amazon.

== Early life ==
Edward Lee Montgomery was born in Cleveland, Ohio, on February 1, 1952, as the son of James Edward Montgomery and Betty Lou Montgomery, yet he was reared by his grandmother, Iola Freeman, in the church at Temple Baptist Church, where he acquired the ability to play the piano.

== Music career ==
His music career commenced in 2000, with the album Show Me the Money, which was released on January 4, 2000, by his own label Ablife Records. He released I Still Believe on November 20, 2000, on Ablife Records, and this placed on two Billboard charts Gospel Albums at No. 11 and Independent Albums at No. 41. The 2002 album, Total Live Experience, was released on July 23, 2002, by Ablife Records, and this charted on the two aforementioned charts at Nos. 7 and 22 respectively, also earning a placement on the Heatseekers Albums chart at No. 34.

== Personal life ==
Montgomery is married to Dr. Saundra Elaine Montgomery, a Clevelander in her own right, and together they reside in Houston, Texas, where they are the pastors of Abundant Life Center (Abundant Life Cathedral). They have three children: two sons, Edward Lee Montgomery II, Simeon Raphael Montgomery, and a daughter, Angela Renee Montgomery, who died of cancer at the age of 14.

== Discography ==
List of selected studio albums, with selected chart positions
Title	Album details	Peak chart positions		
Title	Album details	US Gos	US Indie	US Heat
I Still Believe	Released: November 20, 2000; Label: Ablife; CD, digital download	11	41	–
Total Life Experience	Released: July 23, 2002; Label: Ablife; CD, digital download	7	22	34
