= Judge Montgomery =

Judge Montgomery may refer to:

- Ann D. Montgomery (born 1949), judge of the United States District Court for the District of Minnesota
- Sir James Montgomery, 1st Baronet, Lord Chief Baron of the Court of Exchequer of Scotland
- Robert Morris Montgomery (1849–1920), judge of the United States Court of Customs Appeals

== See also ==
- Tamika Montgomery-Reeves (born 1981), judge of the United States Court of Appeals for the Third Circuit
- Justice Montgomery (disambiguation)
