= Robert Montgomerie (novelist) =

Robert Montgomerie is a novelist and teacher. He read Greats at Oxford University and taught at St Edward's School, Oxford, and, from 1969 until retirement in 1998, at Rugby School. He taught both Latin and Greek, but specialised in ancient history and classical civilisation.

Robert is a member of the Classical Association and the Joint Association of Classical Teachers. He also is the Managing Editor for Sparta - Journal of Ancient Spartan and Greek History.

In 2008, he released his first history novel, with title, Helot: A Story of Ancient Sparta (ISBN 978-0955747410).
