= Richard Montgomery (disambiguation) =

Richard Montgomery (1738–1775) was an Irish-born soldier.

Richard Montgomery may also refer to:

- Richard Mattern Montgomery (1911–1987), United States Air Force general
- Richard Montgomery (politician) (born 1946), Tennessee politician
- Richard Montgomery (mathematician) (born 1990), British mathematician and professor at the University of Warwick
- Ricky Montgomery (born 1993), American singer-songwriter
- SS Richard Montgomery, a still-dangerous ship loaded with explosives sunk in 1944 in the Thames Estuary, England

== See also ==
- Richard Montgomerie (born 1971), cricketer
- Richard Montgomery High School, Rockville, Maryland
