= Thomas Harrison Montgomery =

- Born: February 27, 1830; Philadelphia, Pennsylvania, U.S.
- Died: April 4, 1905 (aged 75); Philadelphia, Pennsylvania, U.S.
- Resting place: Church of St. James the Less
- Children: 9, incl. Thomas H. Montgomery, Jr., James Alan Montgomery
- Parent(s): James Montgomery, Mary Harrison White
- Relatives: Samuel George Morton (father-in-law)

Thomas Harrison Montgomery (February 27, 1830 – April 4, 1905) was an American businessman and writer from Philadelphia, Pennsylvania. He was best known for his genealogical and historical writings and his presidency of the American Fire Insurance Company, which he held for over 20 years until his death.

== Early life ==
Thomas Harrison Montgomery was born in Philadelphia on February 27, 1830, the second son of reverend James Montgomery, D.D. and Mary Harrison White, and was baptized at St. Stephen's Episcopal Church, where his father was then rector, April 7, 1830, by his great-grandfather, Bishop William White. His father died when Thomas was four, and he was raised by his mother. He attended grammar school in Philadelphia, and later attended some lectures at the Franklin Institute but was largely taught by his mother and self-educated. He early acquired the habit of expressing his thoughts on matters that came under his observation, by the writing of a journal which he began at the age of fifteen years.

== Career ==
On March 23, 1847, he found his first job in the large drug establishment of Charles Ellis & Company, in connection with which he took a course in the Philadelphia College of Pharmacy, 1848-9, and 1850-1, receiving his diploma from that institution April 4, 1851. In January, 1852, in partnership with his friend, Samuel E. Shinn, under the firm name of Montgomery & Shinn, he bought out a drug store, but ill health compelled him to abandon the business two years later. On his removal to Germantown, 1856, he began his genealogical studies, which resulted in the publication of the History and Pedigree of Montgomery, 1863. During this period he devoted much time to study and ecclesiastical and charitable work. He was rector’s warden of the Church of Holy Cross, Germantown, 1856, and later member of the vestry of St. Luke’s Church until his removal from Germantown. He also conducted for several years a Bible class for young men, which he had organized.

During his residence in Germantown, Montgomery became associated with the family of physician and anthropologist Samuel George Morton, and in 1860, married his daughter, Anna Morton. At the outbreak of the Civil War, though the state of his health would not permit him to go to the front, he drilled with the troops then being recruited. In 1863 he was elected secretary of the Enterprise Insurance Company; became its vice president, 1864, and a director, 1866; thus becoming identified with the business wherein he achieved especial distinction by organizing and placing upon a safe financial basis the insurance institutions of Philadelphia and vicinity.

In 1871, while convalescent from a severe attack of congestion of the lungs, he wrote the Genealogy of General Richard Montgomery. Failing to regain his normal health, on the advice of his physician, he decided to spend the winter at the south, and, October, 1871, sailed from New York for Frederickstadt, Island of St. Croix. A six months’ sojourn there saved his life and made him physically stronger than he had ever been before. On October 31, 1871, the Enterprise Insurance Company failed, owing to heavy losses in the Great Chicago Fire, and on his return to Philadelphia, Montgomery was, in 1872, appointed general agent of the National Board of Underwriters, and the same year moved with his family to New York. This position he filled six years, and on his retirement, 1878, was the subject of complimentary testimonials to his good work in leading insurance journals, as well as of resolutions adopted by the National Board. In 1878 he accepted the position of manager of the department of perpetual insurance, in the Insurance Company of North America, Philadelphia. In 1880, he was elected vice-president of the American Fire Insurance Company, in the same city, and, 1882, became its president, which office he filled until his death.

While residing in New York, Mr. Montgomery was a trustee of the Church of Holy Communion, and was active in founding several charitable societies. On his return to Philadelphia, 1879, he became a member of his ancestral parish, Christ Church, acting for many years as accounting warden, and worshiping at Christ Church chapel. He continued his historical studies and writings, and was a frequent attendant at the Historical Society of Pennsylvania. In 1877 he prepared a monograph on the descendants of Thomas White, read at a reunion of the descendants held at “Sophia’s Dairy,” on the Bush River, Maryland, June 7, 1877. In 1882, he purchased a country place near West Chester, Chester county, Pennsylvania, which he named Ardrossan, after one of the Montgomery family castles in Ayrshire, Scotland, and this became his home for twenty-three years.

Montgomery was elected to the vestry of the Church of Holy Trinity, West Chester, Pennsylvania, and filled the position of rector’s warden there until his death.

In 1885 he published a history of the Insurance Company of North America, the oldest insurance company in America. Among his other numerous publications of an historical nature, were the Smith Family of New York (1879; “Battle of Monmouth as described by Dr. James McHenry, Secretary to General Washington,” 1879; “Mss. Notes on the Church in America, by William White, 17471836,” New York, 1877; “First Vestrymen of Christ Church,” Pennsylvania Magazine of History and Biography, 1895; “Diary of Lieut. Francis Nicholls, of Col. William Thompson’s Battery, of Pennsylvania Riflemen, January to September, 1776,” Ibid, vol. xx., 1896; “History of the University of Pennsylvania, from its Foundation to 1770, including Biographical Sketches of Trustees and Faculty;” besides which he completed, 1903, the manuscript history of the Dulany, Heath and Key families. He travelled very extensively in this country and Canada, and made three trips to Europe, 1887-89-91, each time visiting the ancient homes of his ancestors in Scotland. He spent the winters of 1903-4 and 1904-5 at his home in Philadelphiam and died there April 4, 1905. He was buried beside his parents at the Church of St. James the Less, Falls of Schuylkill. He was survived by his wife and all children.

Montgomery held membership in the following organizations: The Protestant Episcopal Academy, of which he was for a time a trustee; the Historical Society of Pennsylvania, since 1866, of which he was a member of the publication committee from that date, and of its council since 1880; life member of the New York Historical Society; member of the New York Genealogical and Biographical Society; on the first Council of the Pennsylvania Forestry Association; the Ethnological Society of New York; the Genealogical Society of Pennsylvania; one of the founders of the Society of Colonial Wars, and a member of its council since 1895; member of the Sons of the Revolution; of the Colonial Society of Pennsylvania; director of the Philadelphia Savings Fund Society. He was always active in charitable work, and was a man of deep religious feeling and faith. He was throughout his whole life one of the most vigorous supporters and members of the Protestant Episcopal Church, and wherever he was located he was public spirited, giving freely of interest and means. In 1901 he received from the University of Pennsylvania the honorary degree of Doctor of Letters.

== Family ==
Thomas and Anna Montgomery had five sons and four daughters. Their eldest son, James Alan, became a noted oriental scholar, and their third son Thomas Harrison Montgomery, Jr. became a noted biologist.

== Books ==
- A Genealogical History of the Family of Montgomery, Including the Montgomery Pedigree (1863)
- A History of the Insurance company of North America of Philadelphia: the Oldest Fire and Marine Insurance Company in America (1885)
- A History of the University of Pennsylvania from Its Foundation to A. D. 1770 (1900)
