= George Montgomery =

George Montgomery may refer to:

- George Montgomery (actor) (1916–2000), American actor
- George Leslie Montgomery (c. 1727–1787), Irish Member of Parliament
- George Montgomery (set decorator) (1899–1951), American set decorator
- George Thomas Montgomery (1847–1907), American Roman Catholic prelate
- George Montgomery (basketball) (born 1962), American basketball player
- George Montgomery (bishop) (1562–1621), Church of Ireland bishop
- George Montgomery (drag racer), American drag racing driver
- George Montgomery (pathologist) (1905–1993), Scottish pathologist
- George F. Montgomery Jr. (born 1933), American politician
- George F. Montgomery Sr. (1909–1981), member of the Michigan House of Representatives
- George Washington Montgomery (1804–1841), American Spanish-born writer, translator and diplomat

== See also ==
- George Montgomerie (1712–1766), MP for Ipswich
- George Montgomerie, 15th Earl of Eglinton (1848–1919)
