= Scott Montgomery =

Scott Montgomery may refer to:

- Scott Montgomery (poker player) (born 1981), Canadian poker player
- Scott L. Montgomery (born 1951), geologist
- Scott Montgomery (politician), South Carolinian politician

== See also ==
- Montgomery Scott, Star Trek character known as Scotty
