= Attorney General Montgomery =

Attorney General Montgomery may refer to:

- Betty Montgomery (born 1948), Attorney General of Ohio
- John Montgomery (Maryland politician) (1764–1828), Attorney General of Maryland
