= C. Dick Montgomery =

American politician

Member of the West Virginia Senate from the 2nd district
- In office 1965–1968

Personal details
- Born: July 10, 1926 Clarksburg, West Virginia, U.S.
- Died: December 29, 2003 (aged 77)
- Party: Democratic
- Education: Salem College; West Virginia University

C. Dick Montgomery (July 10, 1926 – December 29, 2003) was an American politician. He served as a Democratic member for the 2nd district of the West Virginia Senate.

== Life and career ==
Montgomery was born in Clarksburg, West Virginia. He attended Salem College and West Virginia University.

Montgomery served in the West Virginia Senate from 1965 to 1968, representing the 2nd district.

Montgomery died on December 29, 2003, at the age of 77.
