= Jack Montgomery =

Jack Montgomery may refer to:

- Jack Montgomery (actor) (born 1992), British actor
- Jack Montgomery (footballer) (1876–1940), Scottish footballer
- Jack Montgomery (politician) (born 1936), American politician and lawyer
- Jack C. Montgomery (1917–2002), American army officer and Medal of Honor recipient

== See also ==
- John Montgomery (disambiguation)
