= Lisa Montgomery =

Lisa Montgomery may refer to:

- Lisa Kennedy Montgomery (born 1972), American political satirist known as Kennedy
- Lisa Marie Montgomery (1968–2021), killer of Bobbie Jo Stinnett, executed by lethal injection
