= Mabel Montgomery =

American actress (c. 1873–1942)

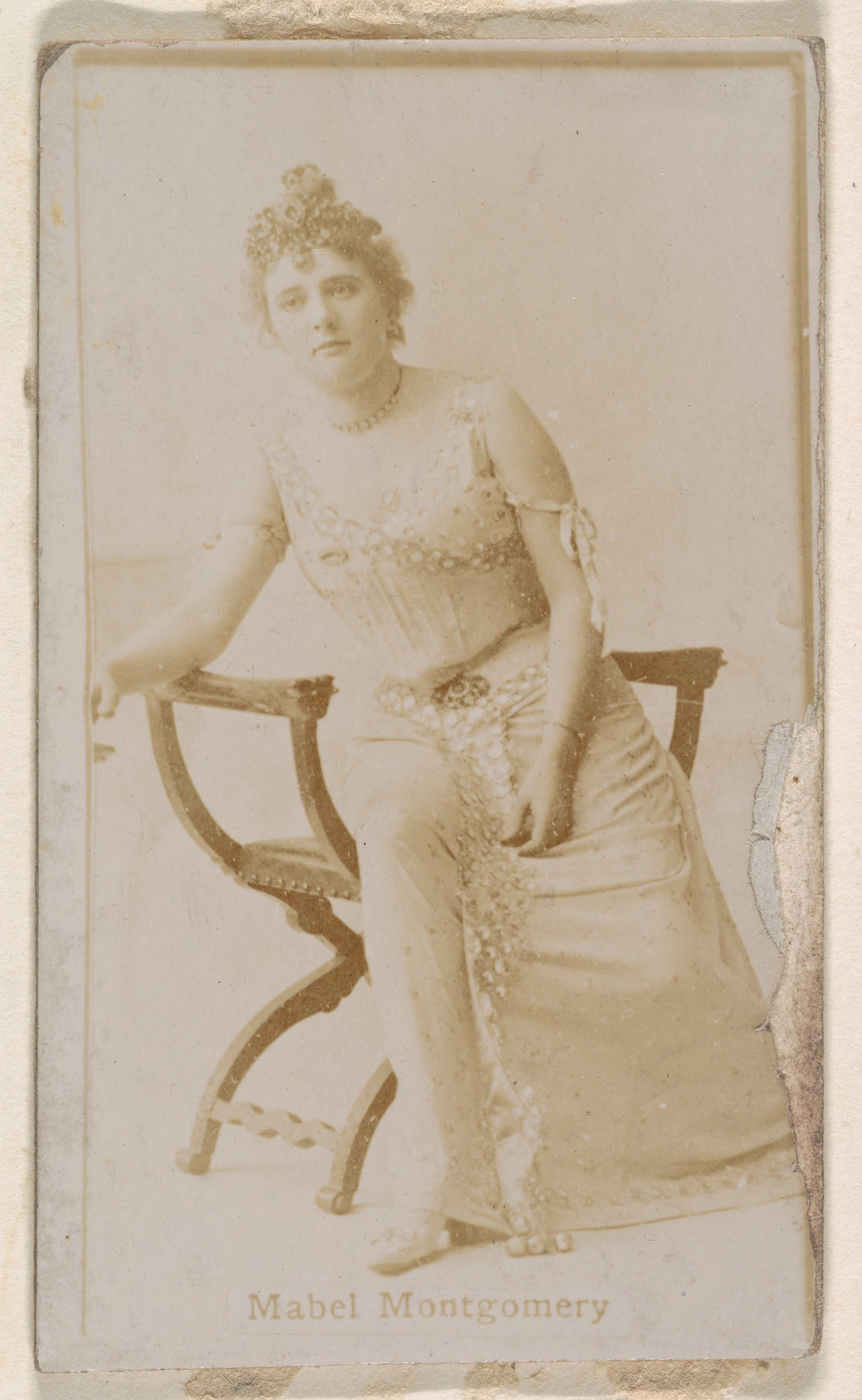
- Advertisement for Kinney Brothers Tobacco Company, 1890
- Born: Mabel Montgomery Mosher c. 1873; Brooklyn, New York City, U.S.
- Died: July 20, 1942 (aged 68–69); Honolulu, Hawaii, U.S.
- Other names: Mabel Mosher Henninger, Mabel Montgomery Mooney
- Occupation: Actress
- Spouse(s): Walter McCullough (m. 1898–1908; divorce), Joseph Roy Henninger (?–1912; his death); Augustus John Gertenbach (m. 1913–1915; divorce), James Mooney (m. ?–1942; her death)
- Children: 2

Mabel Montgomery (née Mabel Montgomery Mosher; c. 1873–July 20, 1942) was an American actress. She was active in theatre and film throughout the early 20th century. She lived in Brooklyn, Baltimore, Chicago, and Honolulu, Hawaii.

== Early life ==
Mabel Montgomery Mosher was born c. 1873, in Brooklyn, New York City; and spend her childhood in Baltimore.

She was a Christian Scientist, and was a member of the Third Church of Christ, Scientist.

== Career ==
She became a known actress by age 17, and was in a series of stock companies, including the Bush Temple Players Stock Company. Montgomery often appeared at the Crescent Theater in Brooklyn (formerly Montauk Theatre), and at the Bush Temple Theater in Chicago. In her later life she primary acted in character roles.

In 1904, she shot at two burglars in Chicago in an attempted robbery.

Montgomery was married in 1898 to actor Walter McCullough (né Walter O'Meliah), they separated in 1905, and which ended in a public divorce by 1908. While she was still married to her first husband, she was caught by the press having an affair with a married dentist, Joseph Henninger. This was followed by marriages to Henninger, Augustus John Gertenbach, and later to James Mooney. She had two sons with Henninger.

Montgomery died on July 20, 1942, of shock resulting from the attack on Pearl Harbor seven months earlier.

== Stage productions ==
- (June 1907), Bush Temple Theater, Chicago, Illinois; role of Jane
- A Women's Way (August 1912), Crescent Theater, Brooklyn, New York City
