= Robert R. Montgomery =

American inventor and Civil War veteran

Robert R. Montgomery (September 8, 1843 – March 7, 1930) of Decatur, Illinois was an American inventor and Civil War veteran who created the fly swatter in 1899 which was later approved for a patent in 1900. Prior to that, flies were usually killed with folded newspapers. Montgomery sold his patent to John L. Bennett, a wealthy inventor and industrialist, who subsequently improved on Montgomery's design.
