= Justice Montgomery =

Justice Montgomery may refer to:

- Alexander Montgomery (Mississippi lawyer) (died 1878), associate justice of the Supreme Court of Mississippi
- Malcolm B. Montgomery (1891–1974), associate justice of the Supreme Court of Mississippi
- Martin V. Montgomery (1840–1898), associate justice of the Supreme Court of the District of Columbia
- Oscar H. Montgomery (1859–1936), associate justice of the Indiana Supreme Court
- Robert Morris Montgomery (1849–1920), associate justice of the Michigan Supreme Court
- Seth D. Montgomery (1937–1998), associate justice of the New Mexico Supreme Court
- William Watts Montgomery (1827–1897), associate justice of the Supreme Court of Georgia
- Walter A. Montgomery (1845–1921), associate justice of the North Carolina Supreme Court

== See also ==
- Judge Montgomery (disambiguation)
