= Peter Montgomery =

Peter Montgomery may refer to:

- Peter Montgomery (mathematician) (1947–2020), American mathematician
- Peter Montgomery (water polo) (born 1950), Australian former water polo player
- Peter Montgomery (broadcaster), New Zealand sports broadcaster
