= David Henry Montgomery =

American author (1837–1928)

David Henry Montgomery (April 7, 1837 – May 28, 1928), or D.H. Montgomery (as he was usually known), was an American author of history textbooks. His Leading Facts series, including The Leading Facts of American History, were widely used in schools from the 1890s through the 1920s.

Montgomery attended Brown University, graduating in 1861. He joined Theta Delta Chi during his time at Brown.

== Bibliography ==
- The Leading Facts of American History (1890) - full text
- The Leading Facts of English History (1893) - full text from Project Gutenberg
- The Beginner's American History (1901) - images from the book on Wikimedia Commons
