= Jim Montgomery =

Jim Montgomery may refer to:

- Jim Montgomery (basketball) (1915–1982), American basketball player
- Jim Montgomery (ice hockey) (born 1969), Canadian ice hockey player and coach
- Jim Montgomery (swimmer) (born 1955), American Olympic swimmer and gold medalist
- Jim Montgomery (American football) (1922–1992), American football player
- Jimmy Montgomery (born 1943), English retired football (soccer) goalkeeper

== See also ==
- James Montgomery (disambiguation)
