= Robb Montgomery =

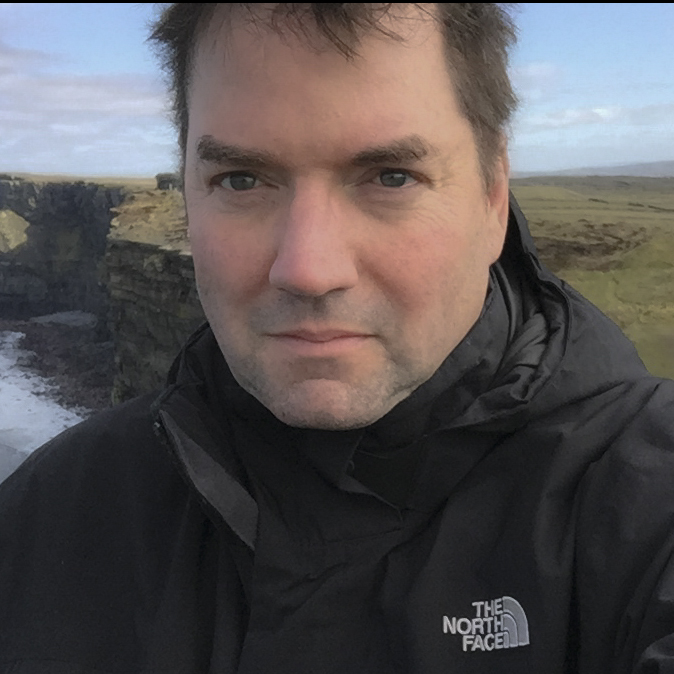
- Montgomery in 2015
- Born: 1964 (age 61–62); Naperville, Illinois
- Education: Eastern Illinois University
- Occupations: Professor; author; journalist
- Known for: Mobile journalism

Robb Montgomery is an American journalist, documentary filmmaker, and visual media anthropologist known for his work in mobile journalism and digital storytelling. He is the author of Smartphone Video Storytelling (Routledge, 2018), Mobile Journalism (Visual Editors, 2020–2026), and the monograph The Trust Graph: An Ethnography of Journalism Rituals and Verification in the Age of AI and News Creators (Visual Editors, NFP, 2026). His ethnographic research on immersive media has been published in the peer-reviewed Journal of Visual and Media Anthropology (Vol. 9, 2025).

== Career ==
Montgomery began his career as a graphics journalist at the Fort Lauderdale Sun-Sentinel in 1990 and later served as Deputy News Editor for Design at the Chicago Sun-Times.

Following his departure from legacy media in 2005, Montgomery developed training programs utilizing smartphones and mobile devices for news gathering. Academic studies identify him as a key trainer within the global “mojo” (mobile journalism) community who helped integrate mobile reporting tools into newsroom workflows.

He has conducted workshops and masterclasses for the United Nations, the International Committee of the Red Cross, the International Journalism Festival in Perugia, and the Global Investigative Journalism Conference. In 2023, he led mobile journalism workshops in Ukraine for reporters working within displaced communities during the Russian invasion.

He has described mobile devices as placing “a TV studio in your pocket,” a concept cited in coverage of his work by the Argentine newspaper La Nación.

== Visual Media Anthropology ==
Based in Berlin, Montgomery operates as a visual media anthropologist focusing on journalism, digital culture, and immersive media. His spatial ethnography fieldwork includes Bikegeist, an interactive digital heritage project that utilizes 3D photogrammetry and spatial computing to curate and preserve Berlin's urban cycling culture.

His research on the metaverse, "Stimulated Reality: Virtual Intimacy and the Anthropology of the Metaverse," and its accompanying short documentary film, were published in the peer-reviewed Journal of Visual and Media Anthropology (Vol. 9, 2025). The study examines how digital-native audiences use virtual reality platforms and AI-assisted companions to navigate intimacy and emotional connection.

== Academic Recognition ==
Montgomery’s mobile journalism methodologies have been analyzed in academic literature regarding modern newsroom practices:

- In Comunicación y Sociedad (2024), researchers discuss how Montgomery’s training programs have integrated into newsroom workflows in Europe, Asia, and the Americas.
- A University of Bergen report (2022) notes that Montgomery’s books focus on storytelling techniques and ethical considerations in mobile reporting.

His methodologies are incorporated into academic courses, including modules at the Singapore University of Social Sciences.

== Smart Film School & Visual Editors, NFP ==
In 2004, Montgomery incorporated Visual Editors as a 501(c)(3) non profit organization in the United States, serving as its CEO. Visual Editors organizes the Mobile Journalism Awards and has screened mobile documentary work at events including the NAB Show in Las Vegas. He also founded the Smart Film School, an online academy offering mobile journalism and documentary certificate courses, recognized globally by major industry networks.

== Publications ==
=== Books ===
- The Trust Graph: An Ethnography of Journalism Rituals and Verification in the Age of AI and News Creators (2026, Visual Editors, NFP, Chicago) – 40,000 word hardcover academic monograph. ISBN 978-0-9903502-4-8; LCCN 2026-906983.
- Mobile Journalism - 2026 University Edition (6th ed., Visual Editors, NFP).
- Smartphone Video Storytelling (2018, Taylor & Francis, New York & London). ISBN 978-1-138-63599-9.
