= Alexander Montgomery (rugby union) =

Rugby union player from Northern Ireland

- Born: 26 September 1871 Belfast, Ireland
- Died: 29 December 1927 (aged 56) Oxton, Birkenhead, England

Rugby union career
- Position: Three-quarter
International career
Years	Team	Apps	(Points)
1895	Ireland	1	(0)

Alexander Montgomery (26 September 1871 — 29 December 1927) was an Irish international rugby union player.

The son of a Presbyterian minister, Montgomery was a Belfast native and played his rugby in the city for North of Ireland, gaining a solitary Ireland cap in 1895 as a three-quarter against Scotland at Edinburgh. His elder brother Robert was capped five times for Ireland and was also a three-quarter.

Montgomery was a medical practitioner by profession.

== See also ==
- List of Ireland national rugby union players
