= Jeff Montgomery =

Jeff Montgomery may refer to:

- Jeff Montgomery (baseball) (born 1962)
- Jeffrey Montgomery (1953–2016), LGBT activist
- Jeff Montgomery, SNL character played by Will Forte
