= Anne Montgomery =

Anne Montgomery may refer to:

- Ann D. Montgomery (born 1949), American judge
- Anne Montgomery (sportscaster), American sportscaster, sports official, author and teacher
- Anne Montgomery (peace activist) (1926–2012), American non-violent activist and educator
- Anne Montgomery (artist), Australian artist
