= Nicholas Montgomery =

Nicholas Montgomery may refer to:

- Nicholas Montgomery (died c.1424), MP for Derbyshire (UK Parliament constituency) in 1388, 1390 and 1411
- Nicholas Montgomery (died 1435), MP for Derbyshire (UK Parliament constituency) in 1414 and 1416
- Nick Montgomery (born 1981), English-born Scottish footballer
