= Frank Montgomery (rugby union) =

Rugby union player from Northern Ireland

Sir Frank Montgomery MC
- Full name: Frank Percival Montgomery
- Born: 10 June 1892 Belfast, Ireland
- Died: 11 August 1972 (aged 80) Belfast, Northern Ireland
- School: Campbell College
- University: Queen's University Belfast; University of Cambridge
- Occupation: Radiologist

Rugby union career
- Position: Fullback
International career
Years	Team	Apps	(Points)
1914	Ireland	3	(0)

Sir Frank Percival Montgomery (10 June 1892 — 11 August 1972) was a radiologist from Northern Ireland and an Ireland international rugby union player.

== Biography ==
Raised in Belfast, Montgomery was the son of Presbyterian clergyman Henry Montgomery, the founder of the Shankill Road Mission who served as moderator of the Presbyterian Church in Ireland. He attended Campbell College and Queen's University Belfast. A fullback, Montgomery was a varsity rugby player, capped three times for Ireland during the 1914 Five Nations.

Montgomery received a commission in the Royal Army Medical Corps after qualifying as a doctor in 1915. Serving on the Western Front, Montgomery was awarded a Military Cross and Croix de Guerre (with bar).

After further studies at the University of Cambridge, Montgomery became a pioneering radiologist. He was the first person to introduce radium into Northern Ireland. In 1948, Montgomery was appointed chairman of the Northern Ireland Hospitals Authority. He was knighted in 1953 for his contribution to medicine. From 1956 to 1967, Montgomery served as pro-chancellor of Queen's University.

== See also ==
- List of Ireland national rugby union players
