= William Montgomery =

William, Will, Bill, or Billy Montgomery may refer to:

== Law and politics ==
=== U.S. ===
- William Montgomery (Pennsylvania soldier) (1736–1816), U.S. congressman and judge
- William Montgomery (North Carolina politician) (1789–1844), U.S. congressman and physician
- William J. Montgomery (1851–1913), South Carolina senator and representative, mayor and lawyer
- William Montgomery (Pennsylvania politician, born 1818) (1818–1870), U.S. congressman from Pennsylvania
- William Watts Montgomery (1827–1897), American jurist in Georgia
- Billy Montgomery (1937–2025), American educator and politician
- Bill Montgomery (activist) (1940–2020), co-founder of Turning Point USA
- William Dale Montgomery (born 1945), American diplomat
- Bill Montgomery (Arizona attorney) (born 1967), American lawyer and jurist in Arizona

=== Elsewhere ===
- Sir William Montgomery, 1st Baronet (1717–1788), Scottish-born politician in Ireland
- William Montgomery (New Zealand politician) (1821–1914), New Zealand MP, minister of education
- William Montgomery Jr. (1866–1958), New Zealand MP

== Sports ==
=== American football ===
- Bill Montgomery (halfback) (1923–2003), American football player
- Bill Montgomery (quarterback) (born 1949), American football player
- Will Montgomery (born 1983), American football center

=== Other sports ===
- Bill Montgomery (cricketer) (1878–1952), English cricketer
- Bill Montgomery (footballer, born 1885) (1885–1953), Scottish footballer
- Bill Montgomery (Australian footballer) (1915–1988), Australian rules footballer
- Will Montgomery (rugby union) (born 2000), English rugby union player

== Others ==
- William Fetherstone Montgomery (1797–1859), Irish obstetrician
- William Reading Montgomery (1801–1871), Union Army general in American Civil War
- William Bell Montgomery (1829–1904), American farmer, businessman, and editor
- William Allen Montgomery (1829–1905), American lawyer, planter and Baptist minister
- William Montgomery (cryptographer) (fl. 1918), British cryptographer in World War I
- William Thornton Montgomery (1843– 1909), American freedman, businessman, farmer, and community leader

== See also ==
- William Montgomerie (1797–1856), Scottish military doctor with the East India Company
- Billie Montgomery, lawn bowler from Northern Ireland
