= Monty Montgomery =

Monty Montgomery may refer to:

- Bernard Montgomery (1887–1976), senior British Army officer who served in World War I, World War II and the Irish War of Independence
- Monty Montgomery (American football) (born 1973), former American football cornerback
- Monty Montgomery (baseball) (born 1946), retired American Major League Baseball pitcher
- Monty Montgomery (producer) (born 1963), American film producer, director, actor and screenwriter
- Monty Montgomery, a character in A Series of Unfortunate Events
- Chris Montgomery, American computer specialist
