= Ray Montgomery =

Ray Montgomery may refer to:

- Ray Montgomery (actor) (1922–1998), American actor
- Ray Montgomery (American football) (1909–1966), American football player
- Ray Montgomery (baseball) (born 1969), retired Major League Baseball outfielder
- Ray Montgomery (umpire) (1929–2009), Australian rules football umpire
