= Mike Montgomery =

Mike or Michael Montgomery may also refer to:

- Mike Montgomery (basketball), American basketball coach
- Michael Montgomery (born 1983), American football defensive end
- Mike Montgomery (American football) (born 1949), American football running back and wide receiver
- Mike Montgomery (baseball) (born 1989), American baseball player
- Mike Montgomery (Pretty Little Liars), television character
