= Alexander Montgomerie (disambiguation) =

Alexander Montgomerie (c. 1550–1598) was a Scottish Jacobean courtier and poet

Alexander Montgomerie may also refer to:

- Alexander Montgomerie, 1st Lord Montgomerie (died 1470)
- Alexander Montgomerie, 6th Earl of Eglinton (1588–1661)
- Alexander Montgomerie, 9th Earl of Eglinton (c. 1660–1729), Scottish peer
- Alexander Montgomerie, 10th Earl of Eglinton (1723–1769), son of the above
- For any of the Earls of Eglinton named Alexander Montgomerie see Earl of Eglinton
- Alexander Montgomerie Bell (1806–1866), Scottish writer on law
- Alexander Montgomerie (politician) (1882–1932), Scottish-Canadian politician from Nova Scotia

== See also ==
- Alexander Montgomery (disambiguation)
