= Roger Montgomery =

Roger (de) Montgomery may refer to:

- Roger Montgomery (architect)
- Roger Montgomery (sports agent)
- Roger de Montgomerie, 1st Earl of Shrewsbury
- Roger de Montgomery, seigneur of Montgomery
- Roger de Montgomery of Poitou
