= Senator Montgomery =

Senator Montgomery may refer to:

- A. K. Montgomery (c. 1903–1987), New Mexico State Senate
- Alexander B. Montgomery (1837–1910), Kentucky State Senate
- Betty Montgomery (born 1948), Ohio State Senate
- Charles C. Montgomery (1818–1880), New York State Senate
- Daniel Montgomery Jr. (1765–1831), Pennsylvania State Senate
- Haskins Montgomery (born 1952), Mississippi State Senate
- Hugh Montgomery (Northern Ireland politician) (1844–1924), Northern Irish Senate
- Sonny Montgomery (1920–2006), Mississippi State Senate
- Velmanette Montgomery (born 1942), New York State Senate
- William Montgomery (North Carolina politician) (1789–1844), North Carolina State Senate
- William Montgomery (Pennsylvania soldier) (1736–1816), Pennsylvania State Senate
