= Matthew Montgomery =

Matthew Montgomery may refer to:

- Matthew Montgomery (actor) (born 1978), Houston, Texas actor
- Matthew Montgomery (cricketer) (born 2000), South African cricketer
- Matthew Scott Montgomery, actor playing the recurring character Matthew Bailey in Disney Channel comedy So Random!
- Matthew Walker Montgomery (1859–1933), Lord Provost of Glasgow, 1923–26
