= John Montgomery (writer) =

John Montgomery (2 May 1919, Spokane, Washington - 5 June 1992) was a writer, poet and librarian who is noted for chronicling the Beat movement.

He attended the University of California, Berkeley receiving a B.Sc. in Economics in 1940. He went on George Peabody College for Teachers, Tennessee where he gained a Master of Library and Information Science post graduate degree in 1958. In 1964 he received an M.A. in Creative Writing from San Francisco State College.
