= Charles Montgomery =

Charles Montgomery may refer to:

- Charles Montgomery (writer) (born 1968), Canadian writer and photojournalist
- Buddy Montgomery (Charles Montgomery, 1930–2009), American musician
- Sir Charles Montgomery (Royal Navy officer) (born 1955), British admiral
- Charles C. Montgomery (1818–1880), New York politician
- Charles F. Montgomery (1910–1978), American art connoisseur, teacher, and scholar
- Charlie Montgomery (1924–1999), Australian rugby player
- Chuck Biscuits (Charles Montgomery, born 1965), Canadian drummer
- Chuck Montgomery (editor), see American Cinema Editors Awards 2008
- Hubert Montgomery (Sir Charles Hubert Montgomery, 1876–1942), British civil servant and diplomat
- Charles Montgomery (American Horror Story), a fictional character

== See also ==
- Charles Montgomery Burns, or Mr Burns, a character in The Simpsons
