= Sir Henry Conyngham Montgomery, 2nd Baronet =

Sir Henry Conyngham Montgomery, 2nd Baronet, PC (1803–1878) was a British administrator in India.

== Biography ==
Montgomery was the eldest son of Sir Henry Conyngham Montgomery (d 1830). The father served in India for many years as a cavalry officer, commanding the Governor-General's Bodyguard during a part of the time when Richard Wellesley, 1st Marquess Wellesley was governor-general; he was created a baronet on 3 Oct. 1808, and married Sarah Mercer (d 1854), daughter of Leslie Grove of Grove Hall, County Donegal. The Montgomery family were a branch of the Scottish Montgomeries, of whom the Earl of Eglintoun is the head, and had settled in Ireland in County Donegal.

He was educated at Eton College and at the East India Company College, Haileybury, to which institution he was nominated as a student on 1 August 1821. He did not, however, go out to India until 1825, having been permitted to leave Haileybury early in 1822 for the purpose of serving as assistant private secretary on the staff of Lord Wellesley, who was at that time Lord Lieutenant of Ireland. There seems at one time to have been an intention that the young student should give up his Indian writership and remain on Lord Wellesley's staff, on the chance of the latter being able to provide for him in the public service in England; but on the advice of Sir John Malcolm, a friend of his father, who went over to Dublin for the purpose of combating the idea, the intention was abandoned, and early in 1824 Montgomery returned to Haileybury, passing through college at the end of that year.

In 1825 he proceeded to India, reaching Madras on 3 November In those days it was the custom for the young civil servants to remain for two years at the presidency town, prosecuting their studies in the native languages. Montgomery was therefore not appointed to the public service until 16 January 1827, when he was gazetted assistant to the principal collector and magistrate of Nellore. On 31 Jan. 1830 he succeeded his father as second baronet. He subsequently served in various grades of the revenue department in the districts of Tanjore, Salem, Tinnevelly, and Belláry, completing his revenue service in the provinces as collector of Tanjore. In all these districts he had made his mark as an able and careful administrator, and the result was that in 1843 he was sent on a special commission to the Rájahmundry (now called the Godávery) district to inquire into the causes of its impoverished condition and to suggest a remedy. It was upon his recommendation, based upon his experience in Tanjore, that Captain (afterwards Sir Arthur) Cotton was deputed to Rájahmundry to investigate the question of utilising the waters of the Godávery for the purpose of irrigating the delta of that river, as had been done in Tanjore and Trichinopoly in the case of the Cávery and Coleroon rivers.

Montgomery's report and recommendations on the condition of the Rájahmundry district elicited high commendation from the government of Madras, and two years later he was selected by the Marquess of Tweeddale to fill a vacancy in the government secretariat. He served as secretary to government in the revenue and public works departments until 1850, when he was promoted to the chief secretaryship. In 1855 he was appointed by the court of directors a member of the governor's council, which post he held until 1857, when, his health failing, he returned to England, and in the course of that year resigned his appointment and retired from the Indian civil service. In the following year, on the establishment of the Council of India in London, Montgomery was appointed to be one of the first members of the new council, and this position he retained until 1876, when he finally retired from official life. On the occasion of his retirement he was appointed, at the recommendation of the Marquess of Salisbury, then Secretary of State for India, to be a member of the Privy Council, an honour which is very rarely conferred upon Indian civil servants.

Montgomery died suddenly in London on 24 June 1878. In appearance he was singularly handsome, although small in stature. In manner he was invariably courteous, and his courtesy was the outcome of a kindly nature. He possessed in a conspicuous degree the rare virtue of readiness to admit error when he found that he had misjudged another. He married, on 3 March 1827, Leonora, daughter of General Richard Pigot, who survived him, dying on 16 June 1889. He left no children, and was succeeded as third baronet by his younger brother, Admiral Sir Alexander Leslie Montgomery (1807–1888).

== Assessment ==
Montgomery's official career was eminently successful. He was not a brilliant man, but he was an extremely useful public servant. As a very young man he was remarked for the carefulness and accuracy of his work. When he became the head of a district, he was regarded as one of the ablest district officers in the presidency to which he belonged. He certainly had the advantage of possessing influential friends. Lord Wellesley had formed a high opinion of him when he worked in Dublin in the lord-lieutenant's private office, and did not fail to exert his influence on his behalf. Sir John Malcolm was also a kind friend to him. But he fully justified their recommendations. By his report upon the Rájahmundry district, and by the recommendations which he made for improving its condition, he rendered a service to the state, the benefits of which still remain. In the higher posts which he subsequently filled in Madras, as secretary and chief secretary to government and member of council, he fully maintained his previous reputation. By the successive governors under whom he served in the secretariat and in council, the Marquis of Tweeddale, Sir Henry Pottinger, and Lord Harris, he was trusted as a wise and conscientious adviser. During his long service in the Indian council, extending over eighteen years, he was highly esteemed both by successive secretaries of state and by his colleagues in the council. His minutes, when he found himself called upon to dissent from the decisions of the secretary of state or of a majority of the council, were models of independent but courteous criticism. He retained to the last a keen interest in the presidency in which the whole of his Indian service had been passed. Indeed, it has been sometimes thought that he carried beyond due limits his advocacy of the claims of his old presidency, as in the case of the Madras harbour project, which was sanctioned by the India office, mainly at his instance, but has been a heavy burden upon the Indian revenues without compensating results. On political questions concerning the south of India he was a high authority. When the nawáb of the Carnatic died in 1858, Montgomery supported Lord Harris in advocating the extinction of the titular nawábship as a mischievous remnant of a state of things which, for political reasons, it was inexpedient to maintain. But he was not opposed in principle to the maintenance of native dynasties. In 1863 he wrote a cogent minute dissenting from the refusal of the secretary of state in council to restore to the rajah of Mysore the administrations of the territories of that state. The policy which on this occasion Montgomery opposed had been supported by two successive governors-general, the Marquis of Dalhousie and Earl Canning, but was subsequently reversed.
