= James Alan Montgomery =

Episcopalian priest and Biblical scholar

Montgomery, c. 1930

James Alan Montgomery (June 13, 1866 – February 6, 1949) was an American Episcopal clergyman, Oriental scholar, and biblical scholar who was a professor of the Old Testament and Semitics (Hebrew and Aramaic) at the Philadelphia Divinity School and the University of Pennsylvania.

He also served as president of the American Oriental Society and Society of Biblical Literature and Exegesis.

== Formative years ==
Montgomery was born in Germantown, Philadelphia, the eldest son of Thomas Harrison Montgomery, a businessman, and Anna Morton Montgomery. He graduated from the University of Pennsylvania in 1887, and the Philadelphia Divinity School in 1890.

== Career ==
An Episcopal clergyman, Oriental scholar, and biblical scholar, Montgomery was a professor of Old Testament and Semitics (Hebrew and Aramaic), first at the Philadelphia Divinity School, and later, from 1913 to 1948, at the University of Pennsylvania. He served as president of the American Oriental Society and Society of Biblical Literature and Exegesis.

He was elected to the American Philosophical Society in 1925.

== Books ==
- Commentaries on the books of Kings and Daniel
  - A Critical and Exegetical Commentary on the Books of Kings, T. & T. Clark (1951)
  - A Critical and Exegetical Commentary on the Book of Daniel, T. & T. Clark (1927)
- The Samaritans: The Earliest Jewish Sect; Their History, Theology and Literature, J.C. Winston Company (1907)
- Aramaic Incantation Texts from Nippur, University Museum (1913)
- The Origin of the Gospel according to St. John, John C. Winston Co. (1923)
- History of Yaballaha III, Nestorian Patriarch and of His Vicar Bar Sauma, Mongol Ambassador to the Frankish Courts at the End of the Thirteenth Century, Columbia University Press (1927)
- Arabia and the Bible, University of Pennsylvania Press (1934)
- The Ras Shamra Mythological Texts, with Zellig S. Harris (1935)
- The Holy City and Gehenna
