= Sir Alexander Montgomery, 3rd Baronet =

Royal Navy admiral

Admiral Sir Alexander Leslie Montgomery, 3rd Baronet (14 March 1807 – 13 June 1888) was a Royal Navy officer.

The second son of Sir Henry Conyngham Montgomery, 1st Baronet, by his marriage to Sarah Mercer Grove, he was educated at the Royal Naval College, Portsmouth, and joined the Royal Navy as a midshipman in 1819.

In 1845 Montgomery was serving as a Commander in HMS Grecian off the east coast of South America. Promoted to captain in 1846, the next year he was appointed an Officer of the Order of the Southern Cross of the Empire of Brazil.

He became a Vice-Admiral in 1871 and an Admiral in 1877. In 1878 he succeeded his older brother Sir Henry Conyngham Montgomery, 2nd Baronet.

On 30 June 1840, Montgomery married Caroline Rose Campbell, a daughter of James Campbell of Hampton Court, and they had five children. He was succeeded by his son, Sir Hugh Conyngham Montgomery, 4th Baronet. His daughter Rachel Mary Montgomery married in 1885 the Reverend Reginald Brydges Knatchbull-Hugessen - Rector of West Grinstead, Sussex, the son of Sir Edward Knatchbull, 9th Baronet and Fanny Knight, the eldest niece and correspondent of the novelist Jane Austen.
