= List of monastic houses in Berkshire =

The following is a list of the monastic houses in Berkshire, England.

Locations of monastic houses in Berkshire
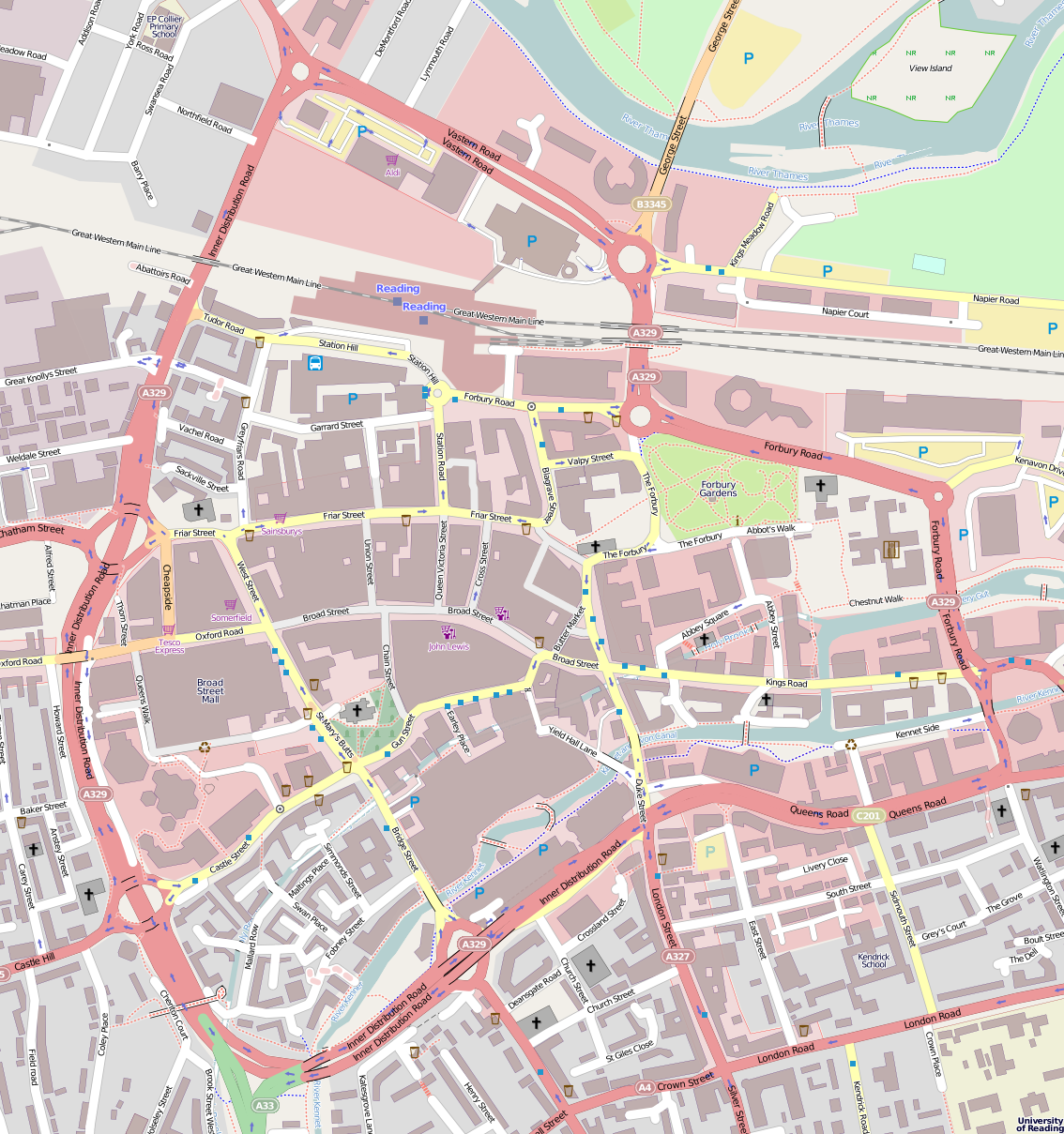
Locations of monastic houses in Reading

Alien houses are included, as are smaller establishments such as cells and notable monastic granges (particularly those with resident monks), and also camerae of the military orders of monks (Knights Templars and Knights Hospitaller). The numerous monastic hospitals per se are not included here unless at some time the foundation had, or was purported to have the status or function of an abbey, priory, friary or preceptory/commandery.

The name of the county is given where there is reference to an establishment in another county. Where the county has changed since the foundation's dissolution the modern county is given in parentheses, and in instances where the referenced foundation ceased to exist before the unification of England, the kingdom is given, followed by the modern county in parentheses.

Alien houses are included, as are smaller establishments such as cells and notable monastic granges (particularly those with resident monks), and also camerae of the military orders of monks (Knights Templar and Knights Hospitaller). Monastic hospitals are included where they had the status or function of an abbey, priory, or preceptor/commandery.

Abbreviations and key

Status of remains
| Symbol | Status |
|---|---|
| None | Ruins |
| * | Current monastic function |
| ^{+} | Current non-monastic ecclesiastic function (including remains incorporated into later structure) |
| ^ | Current non-ecclesiastic function (including remains incorporated into later structure) or redundant intact structure |
| ^{$} | Remains limited to earthworks etc. |
| ^{#} | No identifiable trace of the monastic foundation remains |
| ^{~} | Exact site of monastic foundation unknown |
| ^{≈} | Identification ambiguous or confused |

Locations with names in italics indicate possible duplication (misidentification with another location) or non-existent foundations (either erroneous reference or proposed foundation never implemented) or ecclesiastical establishments with a monastic name but lacking actual monastic connection.

Trusteeship
| EH | English Heritage |
| LT | Landmark Trust |
| NT | National Trust |

| Foundation | Image | Communities & provenance | Formal name or dedication and alternative names | References and location |
|---|---|---|---|---|
| Ankerwycke Priory, Wraysbury | | Benedictine nuns founded c.1160 by Gilbert de Mountfitchet, Kt., Lord of Wyrardisbury and his son; dissolved before 8 July 1536; granted to Lord Windsor 1538/9 then to Sir Thomas Smith 1550/1 ruins in grounds of Ankerwycke House | The Priory Church of Saint Mary Magdalene, Ankerwyke ____________________; Ankerwick Priory; Ankerwyke Priory | 51°26′37″N 0°33′26″W |
| Ascot Priory *, Winkfield | | Anglican nuns founded 1861; extant | The Priory Church of Jesus Christ | 51°25′00″N 0°42′20″W |
| Bisham Abbey ^{#} | | Augustinian Canons Regular priory founded 1337 by William Montacute; built to the northeast of the site of the former Knights Templars' preceptory (see immediately below) dissolved 1536; Benedictine monks abbey founded 1537 by Henry VIII; the abbey incorporating parts of the former Knights Templars' structure; (transferred from Chertsey, Surrey); dissolved 1538; granted to Sir Edward Hoby c.1554; extant preceptory & demolished priory/abbey site now headquarters of the National Sports Council | The Priory Church of the Jesus Christ and the Blessed Virgin Mary, Bisham The Abbey Church of the Holy Trinity, Bisham ____________________; Bustlesham Priory; | 51°33′25″N 0°46′45″W |
| Bisham Preceptory ^{#} | | Knights Templar founded before 1139 by Robert de Ferrers; dissolved 1308–12; Augustinian priory later founded to northeast of site (see immediately above); extant preceptory & demolished priory/abbey site now headquarters of the National Sports Council | | 51°33′25″N 0°46′45″W |
| Bradfield Abbey ^{~} | | monks documented 1066 land granted by King Ine to Hean, Abbot of Abingdon, and Ceolswyth 688-90 to found a monastery; community included monks, status and site otherwise unknown | | |
| Bradley Priory ^{~} | | Benedictine monks dependent on Abingdon Abbey (Oxfordshire) manor, described in 1547 as 'lately a priory'; status and site otherwise unknown | | 51°26′38″N 1°08′17″W (approx) |
| Bromhall Priory ^{#}, Sunningdale | | Benedictine nuns daughter house of Chertsey, Surrey; founded before 1200 by Edward, the Black Prince; accidentally burnt 1462; dissolved 1521 when the last prioress died and the remaining sisters left; given to St John's College, Cambridge remains destroyed or incorporated into farm buildings | The Priory Church of Saint Margaret, Bromhall ____________________; Broomhall Priory | 51°23′23″N 0°37′42″W (approx) |
| Cold Ash Centre * | | Franciscan Friars Minor and sisters Novitiate house for the Franciscan Missionaries of Mary founded 1930s; extant | The Cold Ash Centre | 51°25′22″N 1°15′21″W |
| Cookham Abbey ^{~} | | probable double monastery founded before 726; granted to Canterbury by Æthelbald of Mercia; confiscated by Offa and Coenwulf; restored before 798; granted by Archbishop Æthelheard to Cynethryth, an abbess; site now occupied by parochial church | | 51°33′40″N 0°42′27″W (supposed) |
| Donnington Friary ^ | | Crouched Friars founded before 1404 (1392/3), land granted by Sir Richard Abberbury to the London Friary c.1376; dissolved 1538 (recorded at suppression as Trinitarian, later corrected to Crossed Friars); site now occupied by country house named 'The Priory' | Donington Friary | 51°24′53″N 1°19′52″W |
| Douai Abbey *, Woolhampton | | Benedictine monks (community founded at Douai, Belgium, 1615) removed from Douai 1903; extant | The Abbey Church of Saint Edmund, King and Martyr, Upper Woolhampton | 51°24′31″N 1°10′17″W |
| Greenham Preceptory ^{~} | | Knights Hospitaller founded c.1180 (1199) on estates granted by Matilda Countess of Clare and Gervase Paynell; last preceptor d. 1442; made part of the estate of the prior of England by the grand master of Rhodes 1445 dissolved 1540; briefly restored under Queen Mary | | 51°24′03″N 1°19′10″W (approx) |
| Hurley Priory ^{+} | | Benedictine monks founded before 1087 (1065) granted by Godfrey de Magna Villa (Mandeville) to the Benedictines of Westminster to found a cell; dissolved 1536; granted to Leonard Chamberleyn c.1544 nave of church now in parochial use | The Priory Church of the Blessed Virgin Mary, Hurley | 51°33′03″N 0°48′31″W |
| Kintbury Abbey ^{#} | | possible Saxon abbey, minuter or oratory founded before 931, not mentioned in Domesday survey; land granted to Fontevrault Benedictine nuns and brothers 1147 by Robert Le Bossu to found a monastery; transferred to new site at Nuneaton, Warwickshire 1155; planned refoundation probably never established | Saint Mary | 51°23′30″N 1°27′19″W (approx) |
| Poughley Priory ^ | | Augustinian Canons Regular founded c.1160 by Ralph de Chaddleworth; dissolved 1524 and granted to Cardinal Wolsey's college at Oxford and was occupied by scholars of the college; remains (cellar range) now incorporated into after-dissolution farmhouse without public access | The Priory Church of Saint Margaret, Poughley | 51°28′44″N 1°24′06″W (approx) |
| Reading Abbey | | Cluniac monks founded 1121 by Henry I Benedictine monks refounded c.1210; dissolved 1539; granted to Edward, Duke of Somerset c.1550; quarried and dismantled c.1550-1643 ruins extant | The Abbey Church of Our Lady and Saint John the Evangelist, Reading | 51°27′23″N 0°57′55″W |
| Reading Nunnery | | nuns founded 979 dissolved 1016; granted to Battle, Sussex by William the Conqueror; apparently on the site now occupied by St Mary's Minster Church (restored 1551-1555 with masonry and timbers from the demolished Reading Abbey) | | 51°27′16″N 0°58′25″W |
| Reading Greyfriars, earlier site | | Franciscan Friars Minor, Conventual (under the Custody of Oxford) founded 1233 by permission of Adam de Lathbury, abbot of Reading, and the abbey's convent; transferred to new site 1285-6 (see immediately below) | | |
| Reading Greyfriars ^{+} | | Franciscan Friars Minor, Conventual (under the Custody of Oxford) transferred from former site (see immediately above) 1285-6 with permission of the abbot of Reading; church built 1311; dissolved 15 September 1538; used as hospital, a poorhouse then a town jail; converted back to a parish church | Saint Francis | 51°27′24″N 0°58′36″W |
| Sandleford Priory ^ | | Augustinian Canons Regular founded 1193/1202 by Jeffrey (Geoffrey), Earl of Perch and his wife Maud (Matilda); arrangements made 1274 by Maud de Clare, Countess of Gloucester and Hertford (1223–1289) to refound as a double house for Fontevrault Benedictine nuns and brothers, but this did not come about; dissolved 1478 remains converted to a country house (see also Sandleford); now an Anglican convent school | The Priory Church of Saint John the Baptist, Sandleford | 51°22′39″N 1°18′59″W |
| Shalford Preceptory | | Knights Templar founded c.1198, apparently granted by Simon de Ovile; Knights Hospitaller dissolved after 1276; by 1338 had become a member of Greenham | Brimpton Commandery; Brimpton Preceptory | 51°22′41″N 1°11′54″W (approx) |
| Sheffield Lesser Priory ^{~} | | Benedictine monks alien house: manor-grange dependent on St Martin-de-Noyon, Charleval; founded after 1086, manor granted to Charleval by the Count of Evreux; locally known as a 'priory' dissolved and privately leased c.1166-7; passed to Reading 1270 | | |
| Sonning Minster | | Saxon minster held by Bishop of Ramsbury/Sherborne 10th/11th century sometimes considered joint see with Ramsbury, Wiltshire; current parochial church dating to 9th century, largely rebuilt 1852–3; restored 1870–90 | Hundredal Minster | 51°28′27″N 0°54′47″W |
| Stratfield Saye Priory | | Benedictine monks alien house: priory cell dependent on Valmont founded 1169 or 1170 by Nicholas de Stoteville (Nicholas d'Estouteville): hermitage granted to Valmont; dissolved 1399; house named 'The Priory' built on site (Beech Hill in the Berkshire part of Stratfield Saye) | St Leonard ____________________; Stratfield-Say Priory | 51°22′28″N 0°59′03″W |
| Templeton Camera | | Knights Templar possible small hospice or hostel with chapel; passed to Knights Hospitallers in 1311; in private hands at Dissolution; mansion named 'Templeton House' built on site 1895 | | 51°23′40″N 1°28′56″W (approx) |

== See also ==
- List of monastic houses in England

== Bibliography ==
- Binns, Alison (1989) Studies in the History of Medieval Religion 1: Dedications of Monastic Houses in England and Wales 1066–1216, Boydell
- Cobbett, William (1868) List of Abbeys, Priories, Nunneries, Hospitals, And Other Religious Foundations in England and Wales and in Ireland, Confiscated, Seized On, or Alienated by the Protestant "Reformation" Sovereigns and Parliaments
- Knowles, David & Hadcock, R. Neville (1971) Medieval Religious Houses England & Wales. Longman
- Morris, Richard (1979) Cathedrals and Abbeys of England and Wales, J. M. Dent & Sons Ltd.
- Thorold, Henry (1986) Collins Guide to Cathedrals, Abbeys and Priories of England and Wales, Collins
- Thorold, Henry (1993) Collins Guide to the Ruined Abbeys of England, Wales and Scotland, Collins
- Wright, Geoffrey N., (2004) Discovering Abbeys and Priories, Shire Publications Ltd.
- English Cathedrals and Abbeys, Illustrated, Odhams Press Ltd.
- Map of Monastic Britain, South Sheet, Ordnance Survey, 2nd edition, 1954
