= Brimpton =

Village in West Berkshire, England

Coordinates: 51°22′44″N 1°11′56″W

- Village and civil parish
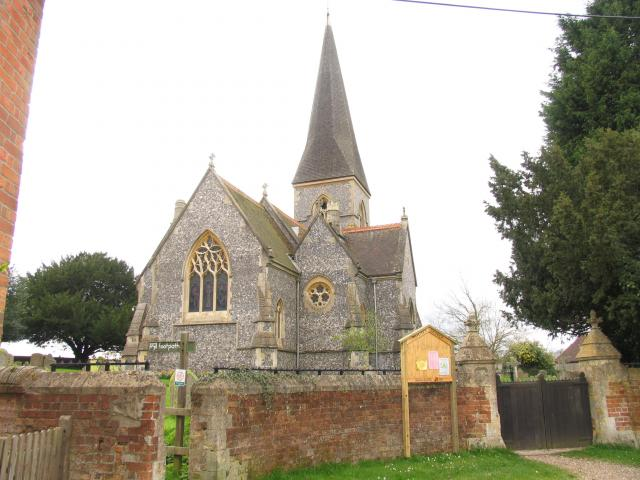
- St Peter's Church

- Location within Berkshire
- Area: 11.86 km^{2} (4.58 sq mi)
- Population: 616 (2011 census)
  - Density: 52/km^{2} (130/sq mi)
- Civil parish: Brimpton
- Unitary authority: West Berkshire
- Ceremonial county: Berkshire
- Region: South East
- Country: England
- Sovereign state: United Kingdom
- Post town: READING
- Postcode district: RG7
- Dialling code: 0118
- Police: Thames Valley
- Fire: Royal Berkshire
- Ambulance: South Central
- UK Parliament: Newbury

Brimpton is a mostly rural village and civil parish in West Berkshire, England. Brimpton is centred 4.5 miles (7.2 km) ESE of the town of Newbury.

== Toponymy ==
One suggested origin of the name of Brimpton comes from "Brynni's Town"; Brynni was an Anglo-Saxon owner of the land. A more likely explanation is that Brimpton stands on a hill, and the name comes from a Saxo-Celtic version of "Hill Town"; the Celtic word for hill being "bryn". This name was probably coined in reference to the Iron Age settlement.

Brimpton has also been recorded as Brinniggetun and Bryningtune (in the 10th century) and Brintone (in the 11th century). More recent alternative names include Brinton, Brimton, Brumton and Brumpton.

== Geography ==
The village occupies a few square miles of land south of the Kennet and Avon Canal and the A4 road, and north of the Enborne which forms the southern then the eastern boundary between slopes of an escarpment where the two parts of the village are concentrated: the nucleus of the village and Brimpton Common. On a lower slope 0.5 miles (0.80 km) south is Hyde End which has fewer than 12 farmhouses and Victorian cottages. Other villages nearby include Aldermaston and Woolhampton. A newer settlement in the parish, Brimpton Common is on the elevated south bank of the Enborne next to Ashford Hill with Headley in Hampshire.

The east of the village is part of the Wasing Manor Estate in Wasing and the village has a few outlying farms with a large minority of its land made up of the sloped woods including Inwood Copse, Chaplain's Wood and Hyde End Wood. Two woods south of the village are managed for timber: Bannister's Wood and Arundell's Copse, the first of these is at the edge of the flood plain of the Enborne.

Brimpton Pit is a site of Special Scientific Interest (SSSI).

== History ==
Evidence of Bronze Age inhabitation of Brimpton is in the five round barrows and two bell barrows in the area leading up to the border with Baughurst to the south. Known as "Borson Barrows", the tumuli were referred to in an Anglo-Saxon charter in AD 944. There have also been Iron Age and Roman settlements identified within the parish. The hypocaust of a villa was uncovered in the village, though records of its exact location no longer exist. One possible location is opposite Brimpton House near the parish church. A mediaeval bronze steelyard weight was found in the garden of the old moated house at Brimpton Manor.

In the 10th century, 10 hides of land in Brimpton were given to Ordulf (or Ordwulf), a thegn of Edmund I. The Domesday Book of 1086 lists the village as "Brintone", and identifies Robert FitzGerald and Ralph de Mortimer as the lords of the manors of Shalford and Brimpton respectively. It also mentions two churches, three mills, and a dairy.

Brimpton was visited by William Cobbett on 30 October 1822 on his way to London; he noted its name as "Brimton", but did not write further about the village. John Marius Wilson's Imperial Gazetteer of England and Wales (1870–1872) described Brimpton as "a parish in Newbury district, Berks; on the rivers Emborne and Kennet". Wilson noted that the area of the village measured 1,692 acres (685 ha) and had property to the value of £3,720 (equivalent to £382,840 in 2025). The population was 452, divided amongst 101 homes. He described the position of vicar including vicarage, at that time under the patronage of Rev. G B Caffin, as worth £351. He wrote that the church was "good", with charities of £84. Of its history Wilson noted that a preceptory of the Knights Templar (Shalford Preceptory) was established in Brimpton in the 13th century. A medieval roll has reference to the Hospitallers as holding land here in 1251 and again in 1275–6, when they are described as of Shalford. In 1302 the king appears to have been the guest of the Knights at Brimpton – his Letters Patent were dated from Shalford manor here 29 November, and the Hospitallers continued to hold this manor till their dissolution in 1540, when it was under the dissolution of the monasteries seized and redistributed by Henry VIII.

At the centre of the village is the war memorial commemorating the twenty two former residents who died in World War I and two who died in World War II.

=== Social history ===
The village relied heavily on agriculture which covers most of the district and employed more than half of the working population in the 19th century. St. Peter's almshouses for aged married couples and aged widows were erected by Anne Bankes, then Countess of Falmouth, who by her will left £3,000 for their repair, maintenance and inmates' support. She left almost £667 in the church's trust for the school mistress' salary (combined these are equivalent to £402,827 in 2025). The trust fund, with accumulations, was for many years the most significant in the village and produced an income of almost £80 a year in 1924, when each inmate received a small pension of a fifth of a pound a week, with an extra payment at Christmas and Easter.

=== Lords of the Manor ===
==== Brimpton Manor ====
At the time of Edward the Confessor, Brimpton Manor was owned by Godwin, Earl of Wessex (Edward's father-in-law). It was later owned by Ralph de Mortimer (at the time of the Domesday Survey) and, subsequently, his son Hugh. Hugh's son, Roger Mortimer of Wigmore, succeeded him as lord of the manor, and the ownership passed through the Mortimer of Wigmore family. The manor passed through marriage to the Earldom of March. Edmund Mortimer, 5th Earl of March died childless in the 1420s and the manor was inherited by Richard, Duke of York. After his death in 1460, the manor was owned by his wife Cecily Neville, until its ownership was reverted to the crown on her death.

==== Shalford Manor ====
In the Domesday Survey, Shalford Manor was owned by Robert FitzGerald. It had previously been under the ownership of Brictric, a Saxon freeman and thegn to Edward the Confessor. After FitzGerald's death, his estates passed to his brother Gerald, and subsequently to Gerald's son, Roger. On Roger's death, his son – William de Roumare, Earl of Lincoln – inherited the manor. William's son predeceased him, so the manor passed to his grandson – also named William. During this ownership, Simon de Ovile – a tenant of William – granted use of the 3.5 hide estate to the Knights Hospitaller. Letters Patent dated 29 November 1302 show that the Knights hosted Edward I at Shalford.

The Knights held the manor until their dissolution in 1540. After this, ownership passed to the crown.

In 1544, Henry VIII exchanged the manor with William Wollascott for the manor of Dalehall in Lawford, Essex. Wollascott's son, also named William, purchased the manor of Brimpton in 1595. When he became lord of the manor upon his father's death in 1618, he became owner of both manors.

== Demography ==
2011 Published Statistics: Population, home ownership and extracts from Physical Environment, surveyed in 2005
Output area	Homes owned outright	Owned with a loan	Socially rented	Privately rented	Other	km^{2} roads	km^{2} water	km^{2} domestic gardens	Usual residents	km^{2}
Civil parish	51	47	48	33	4	0.08	0.0001	0.13	459	8.05

The mean age of residents was in 2001: 38.74, and the median was 40.

== Religion ==
There have been at least three churches in Brimpton, two of which are still in use. The main Anglican church is dedicated to St Peter, and is a Grade II listed building. It was built in 1869 in designed in the 14th-century style. The flint building has a tower (with an octagonal shingled spire) and a wooden porch. The roof is tiled. The interior has a chancel, organ chamber, vestry, a nave with three bays and two aisles, and is faced with ashlar. The structural columns are granite. The belfry holds four bells, dating from 1624 to 1842. The oldest bell, the fourth, was recast by Mears and Stainbank in 1876.

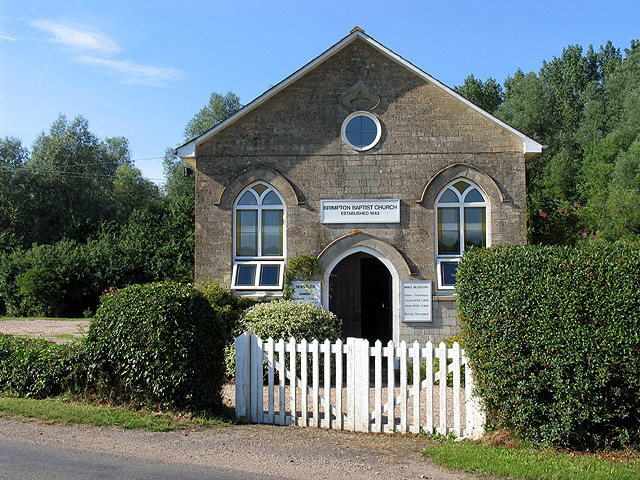
Brimpton Baptist Church

The other operational church is Brimpton Baptist Church, which was established in 1843.

The chapel of St Leonard, a 14th-century stone building, is located on Manor Farm. It was used as the place of worship of the Shalford Preceptory, a group of Knights Templar (and later Knights Hospitaller) who had formed in the 13th century. By 1614, the chapel had been converted into a barn at Brimpton Court.

== Amenities ==
The village had a charity shop and a pub, The Three Horseshoes. Brimpton has the village church. There is also a Church of England primary school. Brimpton Airfield, a mile east of the village, has a 620 metres (2,030 ft) grass runway for light aircraft.

== Demography ==
2011 Published Statistics: Population, home ownership and extracts from Physical Environment, surveyed in 2005
Output area	Homes owned outright	Owned with a loan	Socially rented	Privately rented	Other	km^{2} roads	km^{2} water	km^{2} domestic gardens	Usual residents	km^{2}
Civil parish	86	77	32	44	11	0.131	0.408	0.285	616	11.86
