= Viva Seton Montgomerie =

British socialite and author

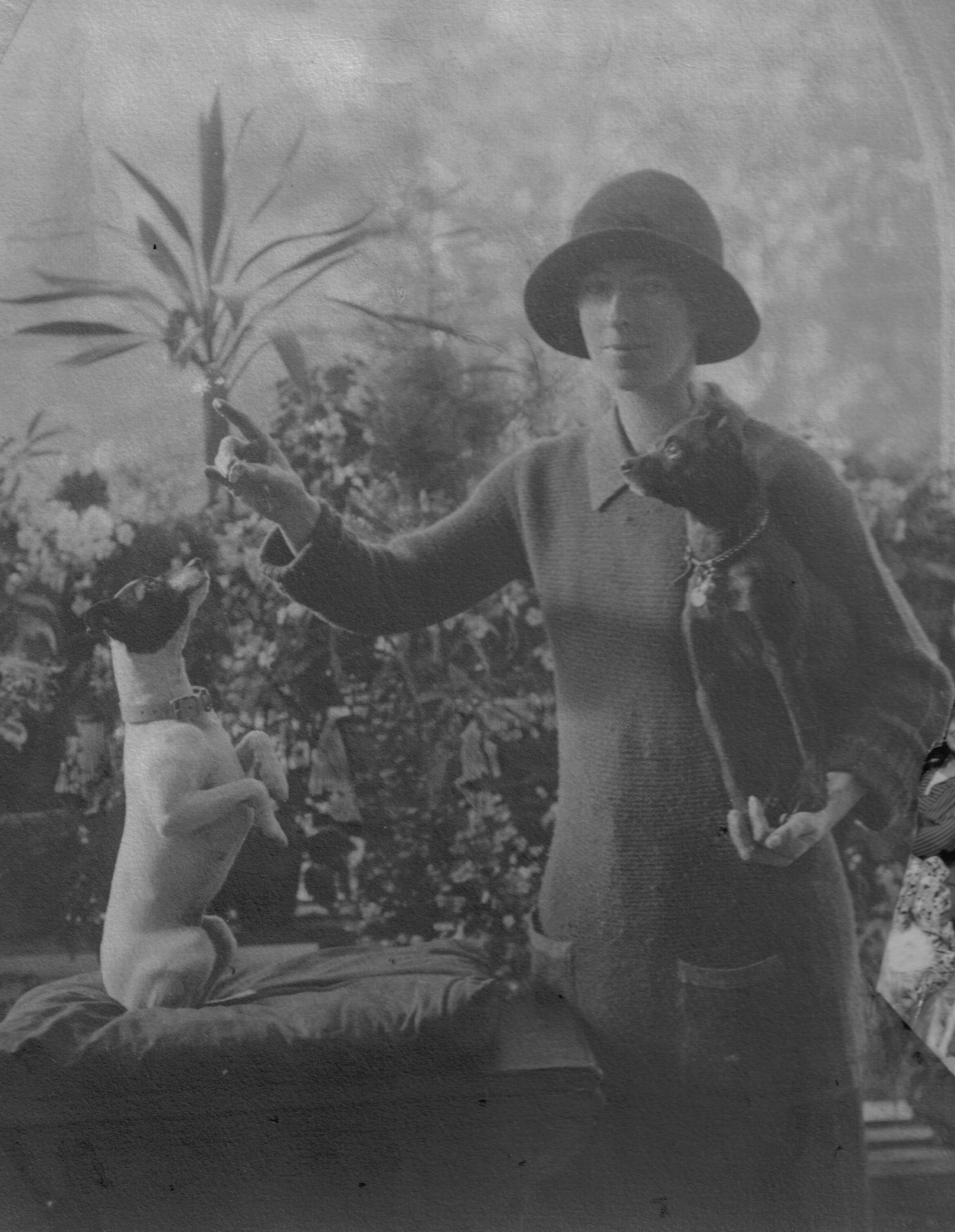
Viva Seton Montgomerie

Viva Seton Montgomerie (1879 – 14 April 1959) was a British socialite and minor author, daughter of the Hon. Seton Montolieu Montgomerie (the second son of Archibald Montgomerie, 13th Earl of Eglinton) and his wife, Nina Janet Bronwen Peers Williams, daughter of Lt.-Col. Thomas Peers Williams.

== Family ==
Her father, a Lieutenant in the service of the Scots Fusilier Guards, died from the effects of diabetes at the age of 37. His younger brother George (1848–1919) eventually became the 15th Earl of Eglinton and Winton (succeeded in turn by his son Archibald as the 16th Earl).

Viva's aunt, Lady Egida Montgomerie (d. 13 January 1880), married Frederick William Brook Thellusson, 5th Baron Rendlesham. Her grandmother, Lady Theresa, died in December 1853, and her grandfather, the 13th Earl of Eglinton, married again, her step-grandmother being the Hon. Adela, daughter of Arthur Capell, 6th Earl of Essex, in 1858. Viva had two step-aunts through this marriage, Lady Sybil Amelia Montgomerie (d. 3 February 1932) and Lady Hilda Rose Montgomerie (d. 18 June 1928). Her cousin Julie, Aunt Gwenfra's daughter, became Princess Woroniecki.

Viva had two sisters; however May only survived a few months. Her older sister, Alswen Dorothy Rose Montgomerie (d. 23 December 1943), was an amateur artist. She provided the paintings of the Riviera for a book they co-authored. Their mother never remarried.

=== Family photographs ===
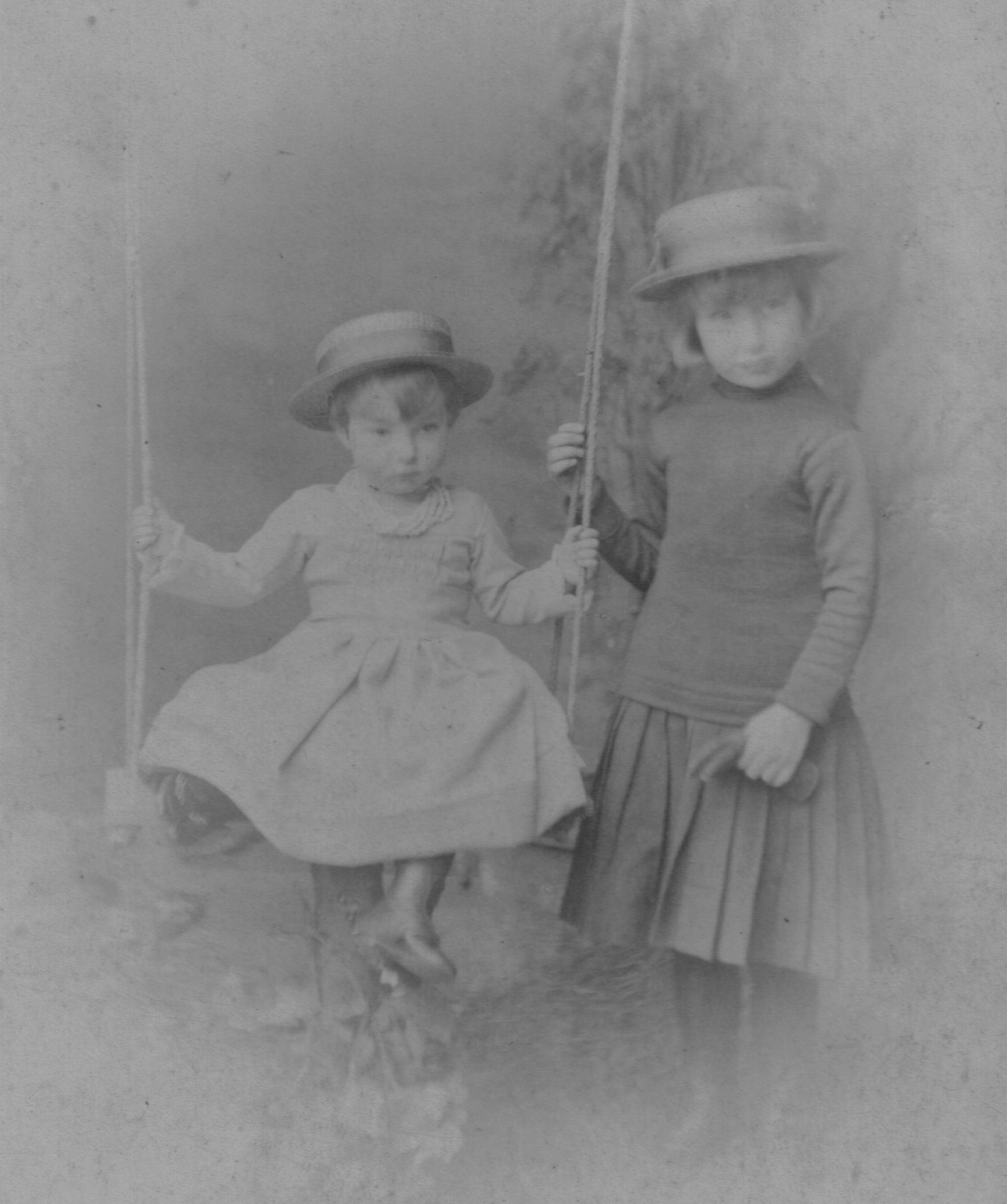
Viva and Alswen in 1881

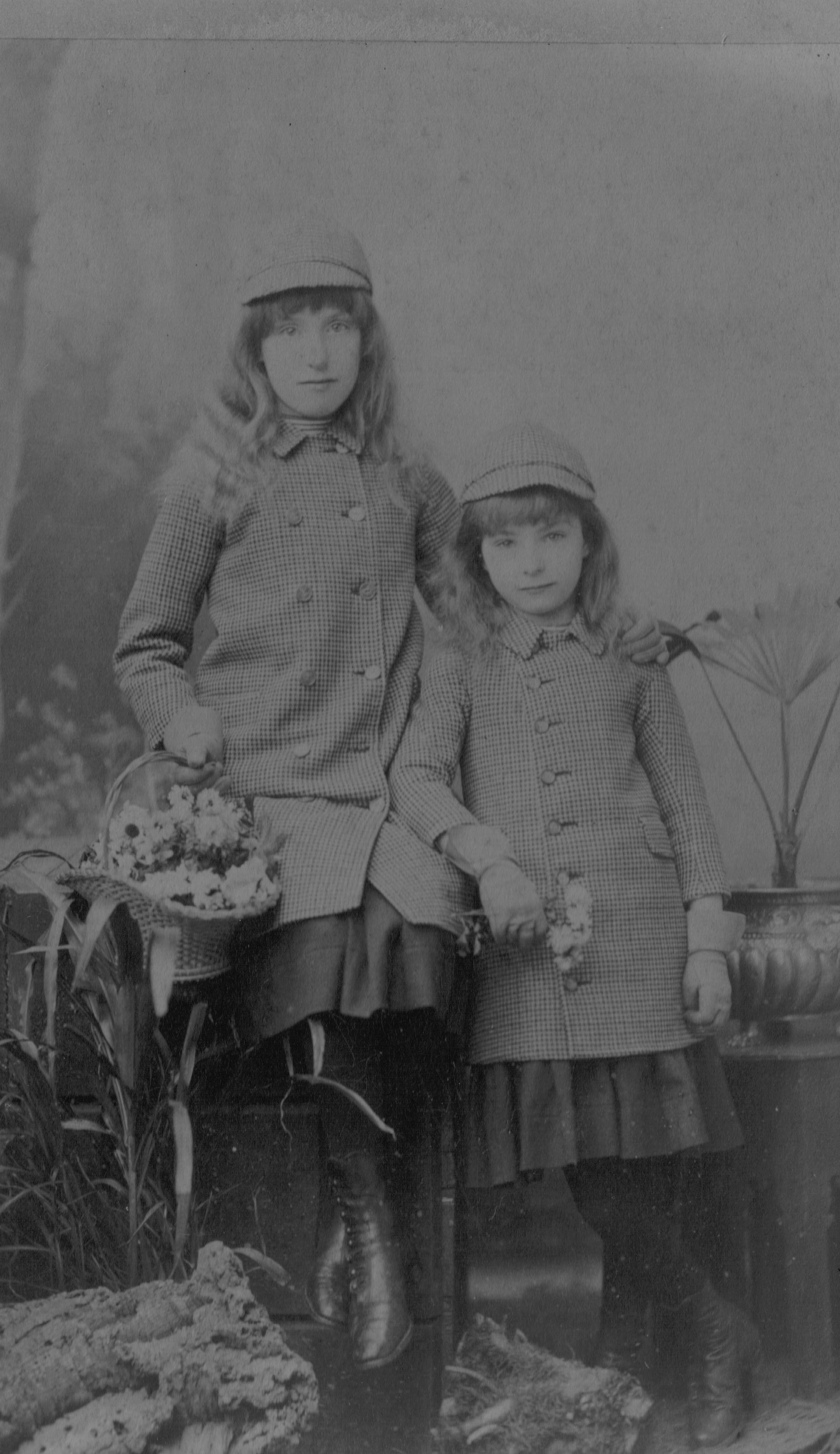
Alswen and Viva Montgomerie

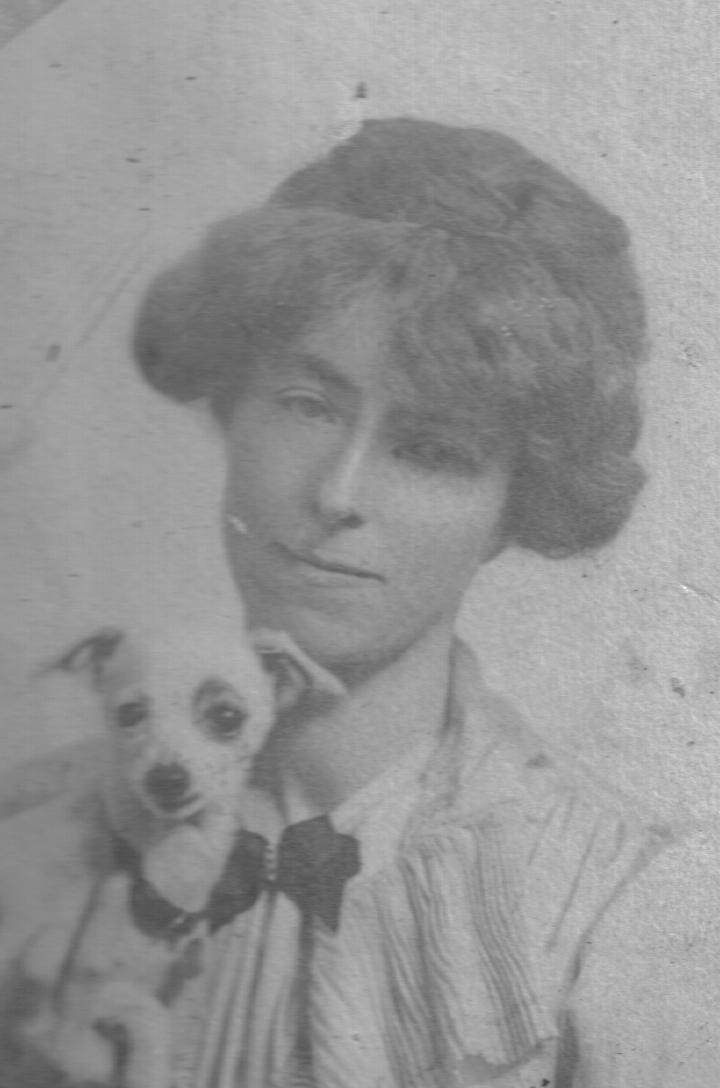
Viva and pet

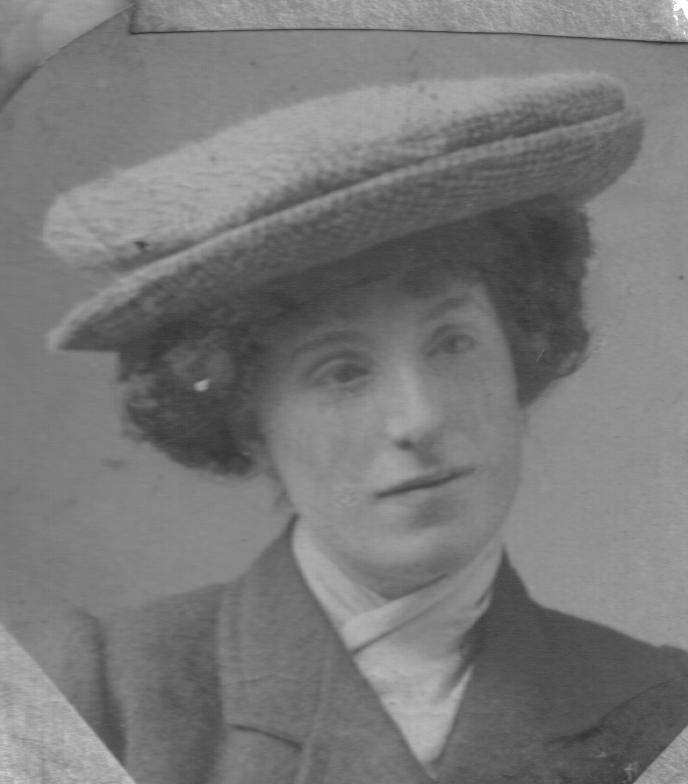
Viva's sister, Alswen

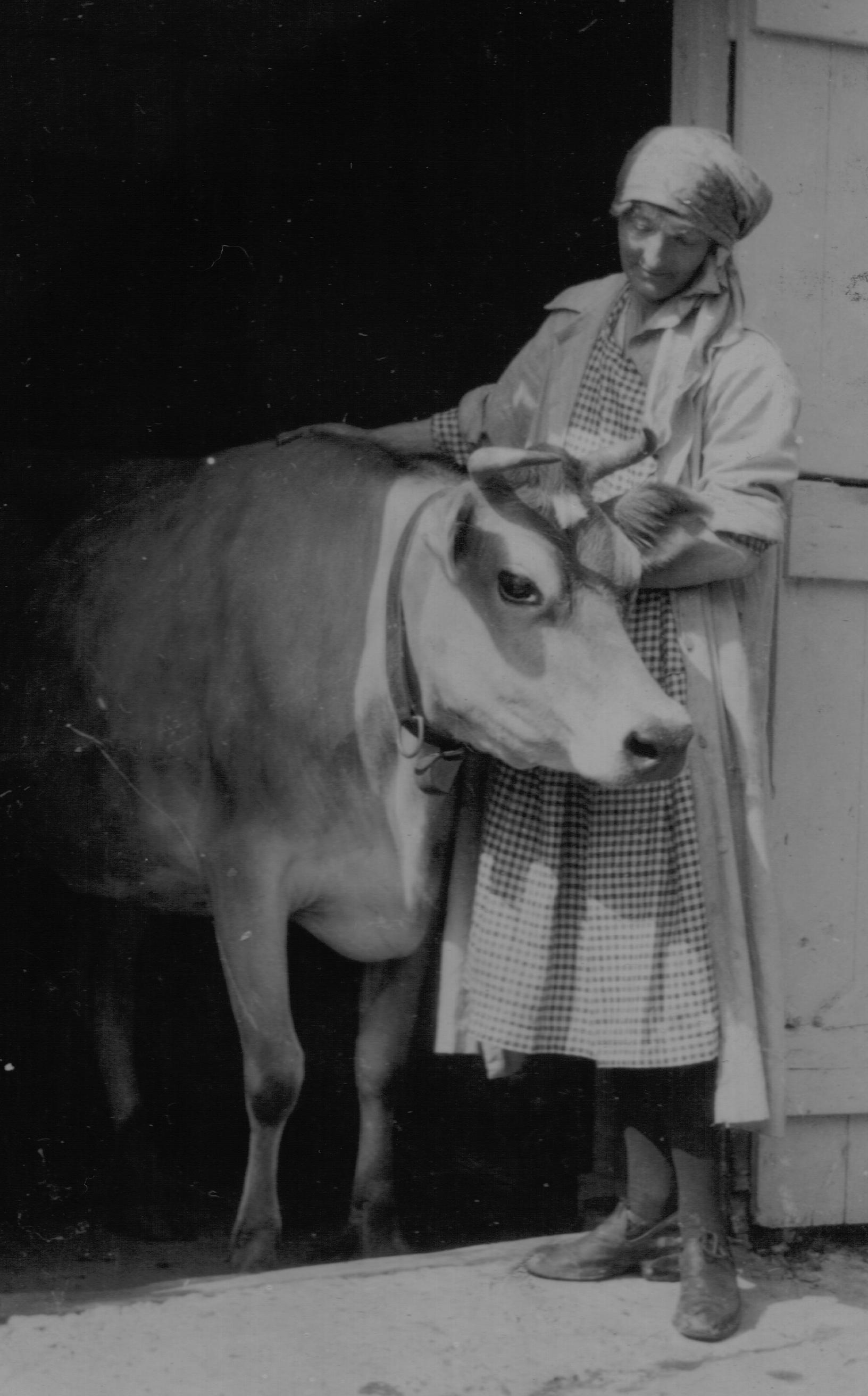
Viva and one of her herd of Guernsey cattle

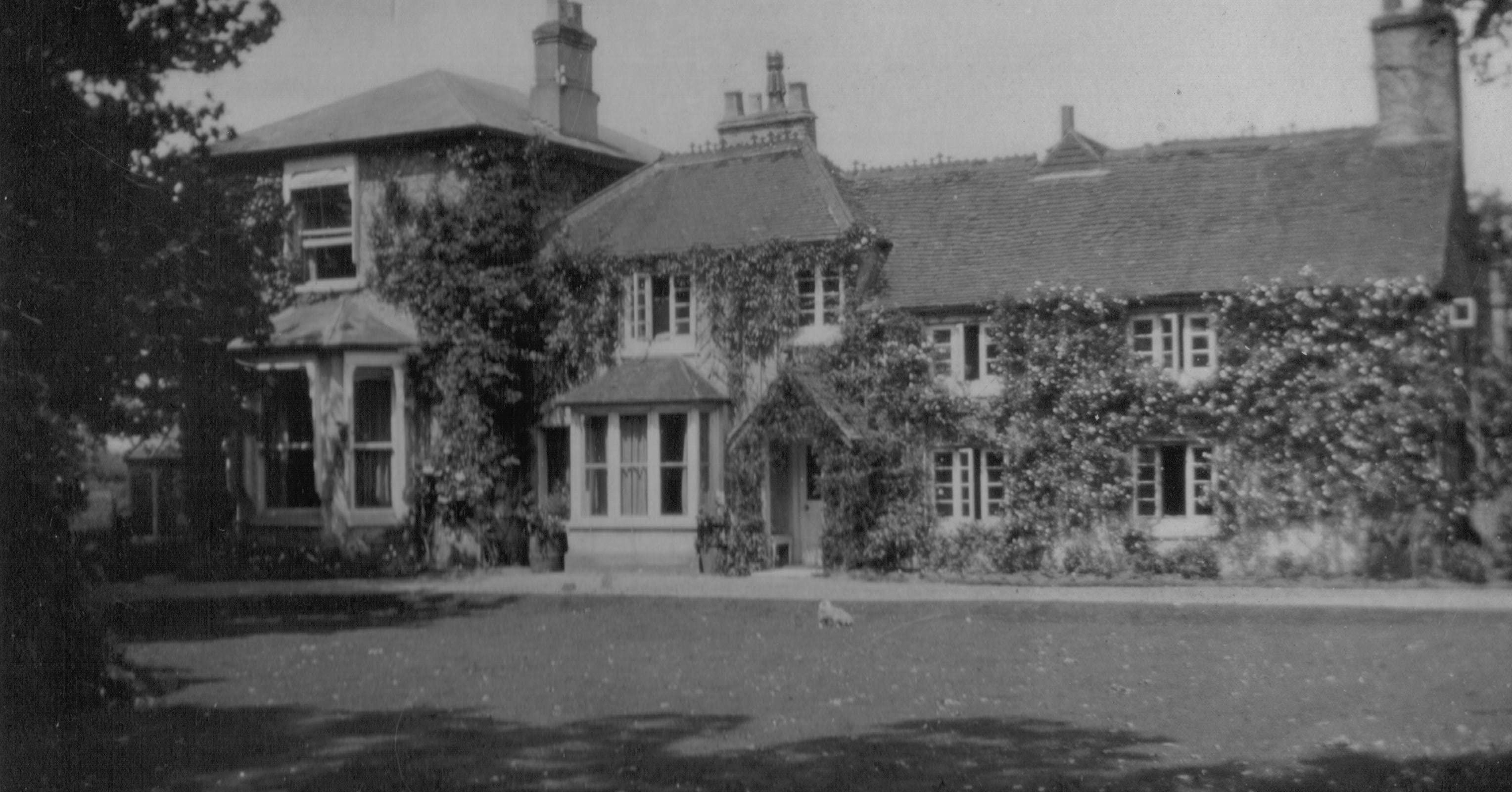
Rydes Hill Lodge, Guildford

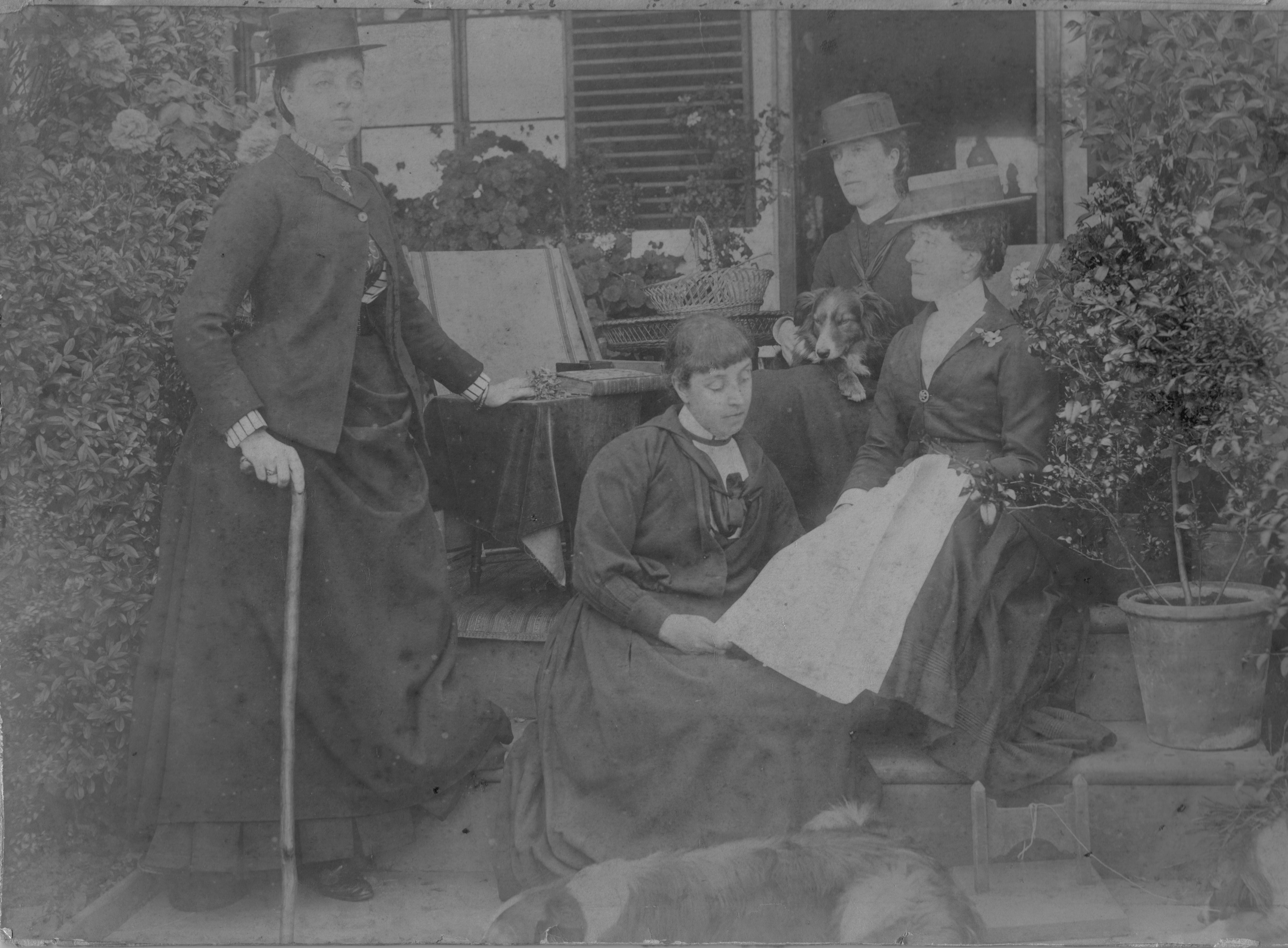
Viva's mother Bronwen (with a dog on her lap) and aunts Madge (Lady Bulkely), Edith (Lady Aylesford) and Gwen (Lady Cowley; standing, far left)

== Life ==
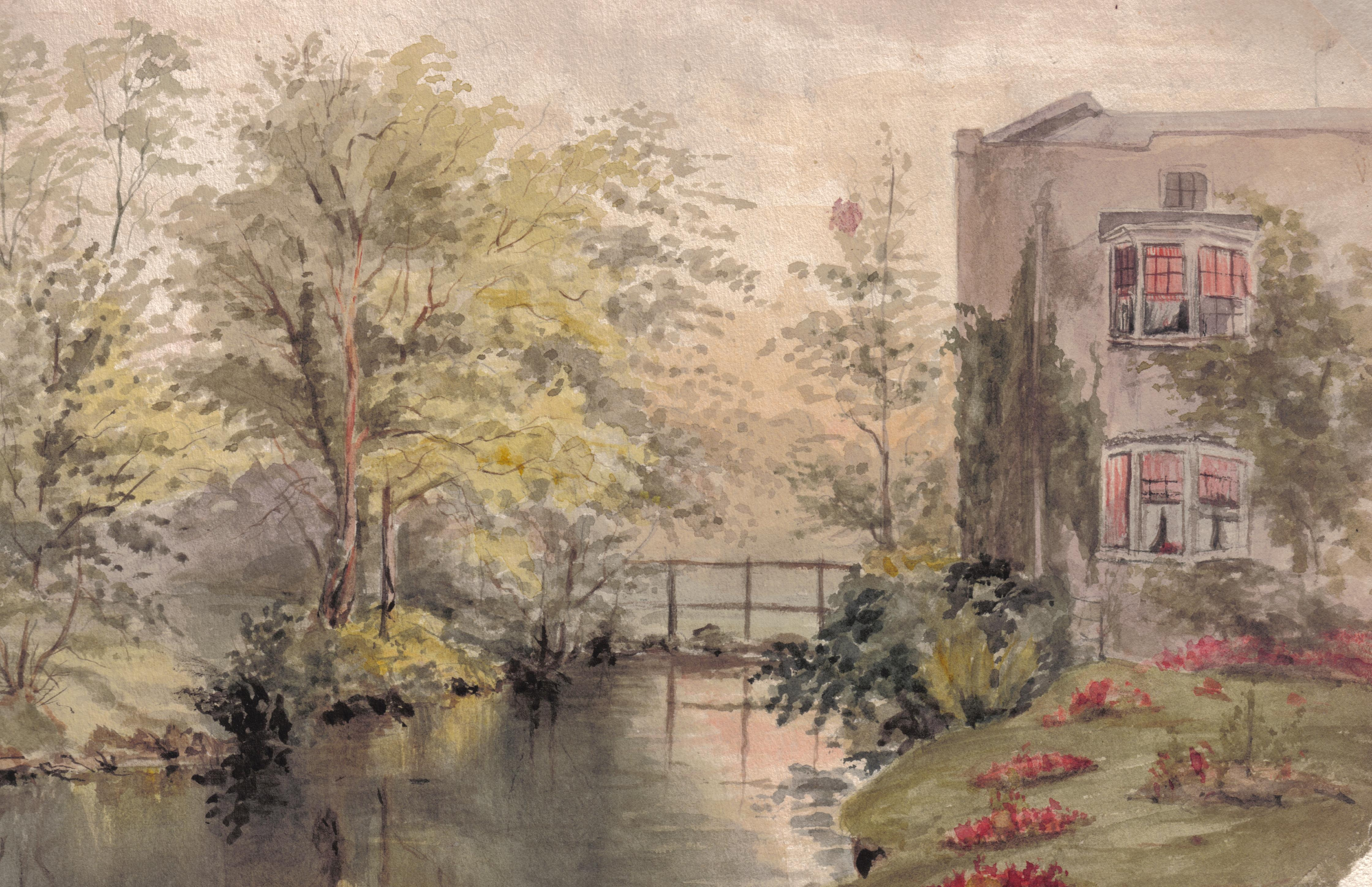
Sandleford Cottage, one of Viva's former homes.

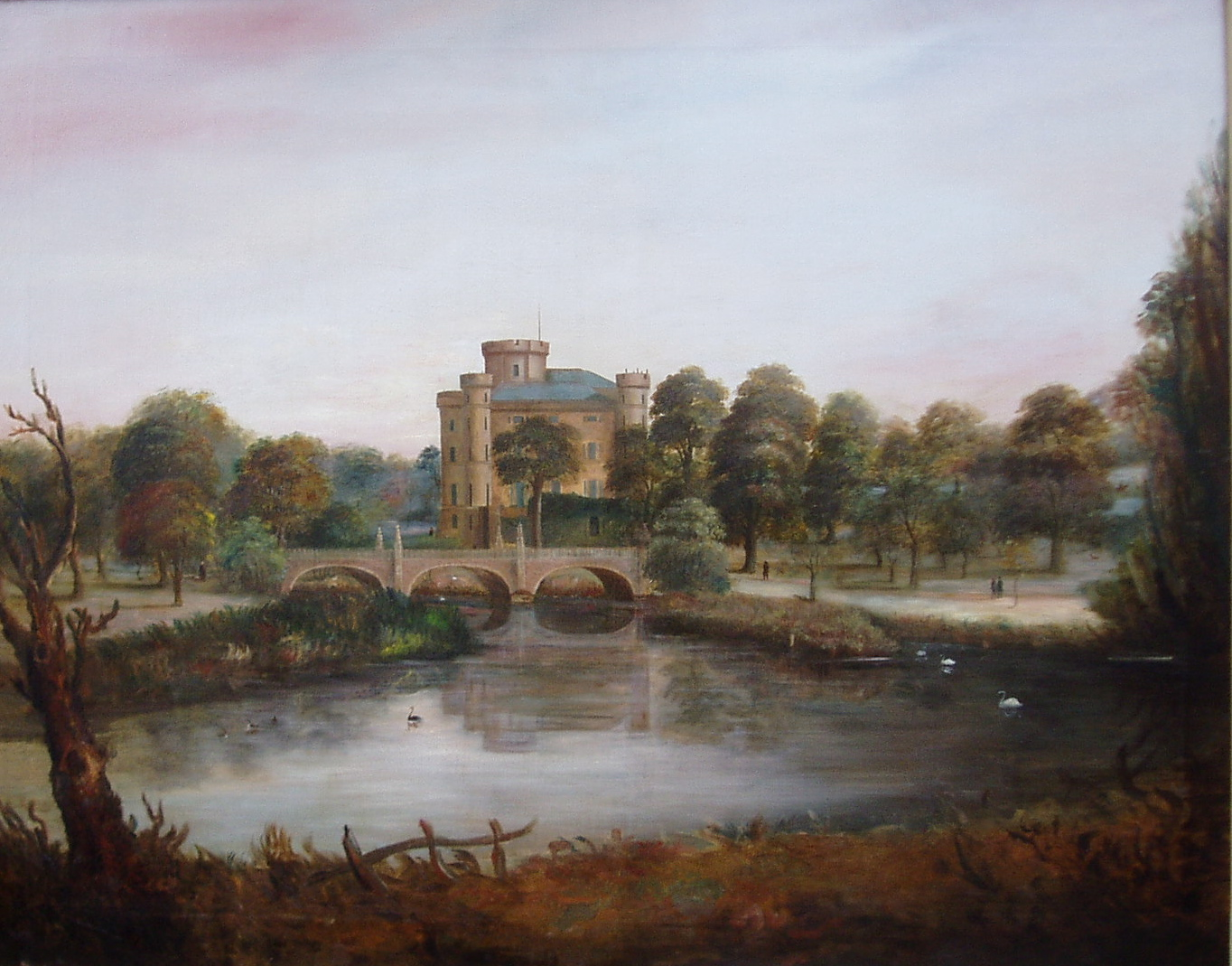
Viva's family's seat, Eglinton Castle. She came here for her 'coming-out' ball.

Viva's aunt Evelyn was married to Henry Wellesley, 3rd Duke of Wellington, and she spent much of her childhood at their home, Stratfield Saye House. She also lived at Temple Hill in Maidenhead, London; Elm Leigh Farm near Winkfield; Sandleford Cottage near Sandleford Priory; Stoughton Grange near Guildford; Rydes Hill Lodge, Guildford; and finally the 'Willows', Chiddingfold.

Margot Asquith, Countess of Oxford and Asquith was part of Viva's social circle, as was Ethel Beatty, wife of David Beatty, 1st Earl Beatty. Viva recalled an anecdote regarding Admiral Beatty:

There was a certain armchair which accompanied them everywhere they went, and when the Admiral was leading forth his fleet, en route for his great Battle of Jutland, he discovered that the chair had been left behind. I shall have no luck without it, he said, and the whole fleet had to be drawn up while his talisman was fetched. It was a chair he had looted during his campaign in China and he firmly believed it was haunted by its former owner. Ethel confirmed this, for she told me that she had distinctly seen a Chinese figure sitting in it as she came into the room, and she saw it fade as she drew near.

Viva recalled meeting, but not liking, Oscar Wilde at high society parties held at Park Gate near Richmond Park by Lord and Lady Charley Beresford. In her unpublished memoirs she says that

He was a very large man, but he walked with a noiseless tread so no one heard him coming, and when his dominating presence appeared in the room everyone at once stopped talking. He was accustomed to this and immediately dominated the conversation and 'took the floor' as they say.

Viva took a mild interest in the Oxford Group led by Dr Frank Buchman, commenting that:

The programme seemed to be, for any of the guest who felt inclined, to get up and speechify and pour out a history of their private thoughts and mistakes and experiences of all kinds. This confessional process apparently afforded them great relief, for I must admit I never met such a delightfully happy society.

Viva never married and spent her final years at the 'Willows', Chiddingfold, in Surrey. She died in 1959, aged 80.

== Author ==
Viva wrote two books; the first, published in 1914, was Sunny Days on the Riviera. Being a Diary of Some Sketching at Eze, illustrated with views of the Riviera by her sister Alswen. The second book was My Scrapbook of Memories, privately published in 1955. These publications contain many references and anecdotes regarding her father, Seton Montolieu Montgomerie, her mother Bronwen, her sister Alswen, as well as Montgomerie, Peers Williams's and other family members. Viva also published a small undated book of poetry entitled Twilight Thoughts.
