= Seton Montolieu Montgomerie =

British tennis player

The Hon. Seton Montolieu Montgomerie (15 May 1846 – 26 November 1883) was the second son of Archibald Montgomerie, 13th Earl of Eglinton (1812–1861).

== Life and family ==
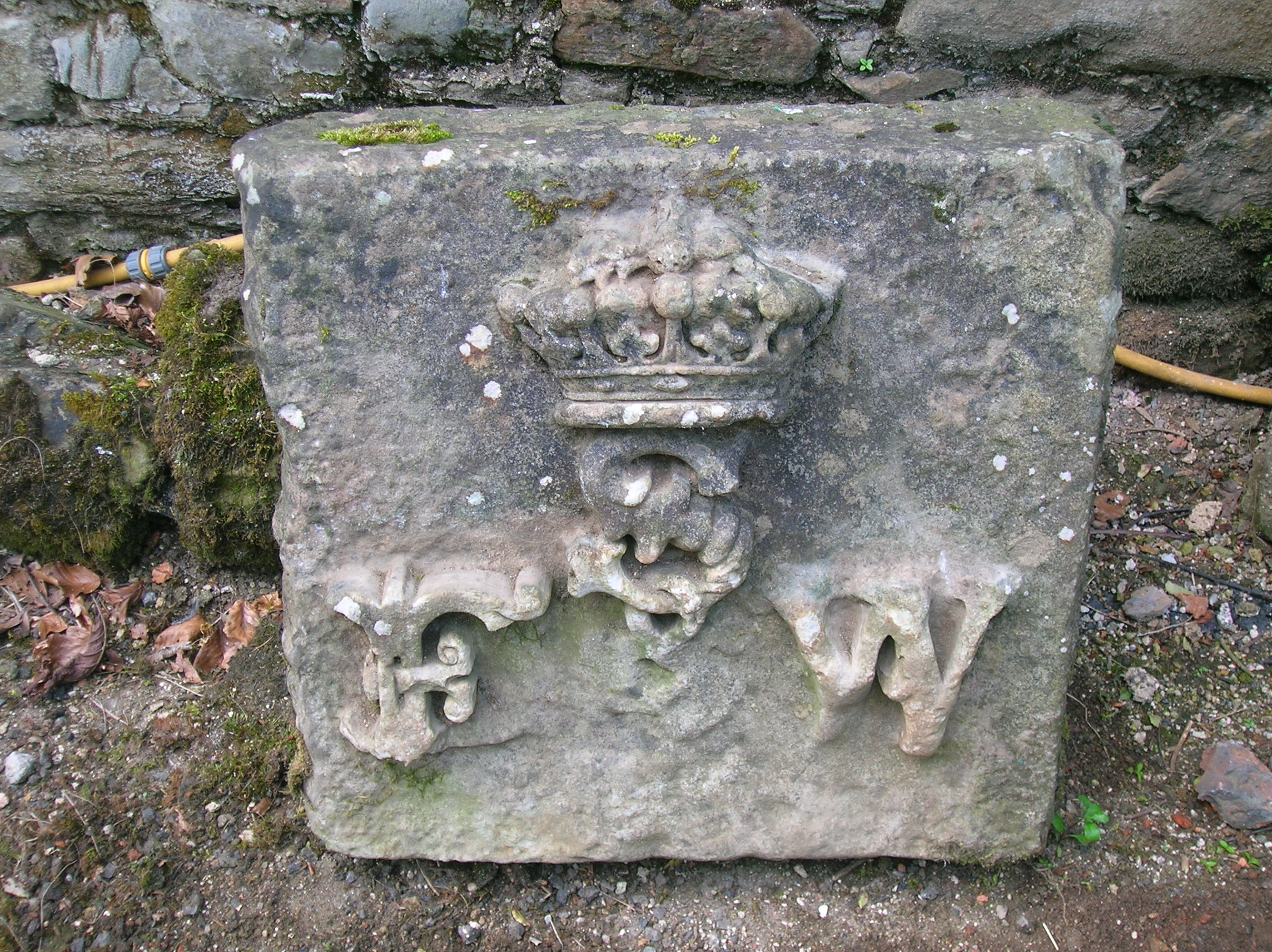
Stone from Eglinton Castle indicating the Seton family connection.

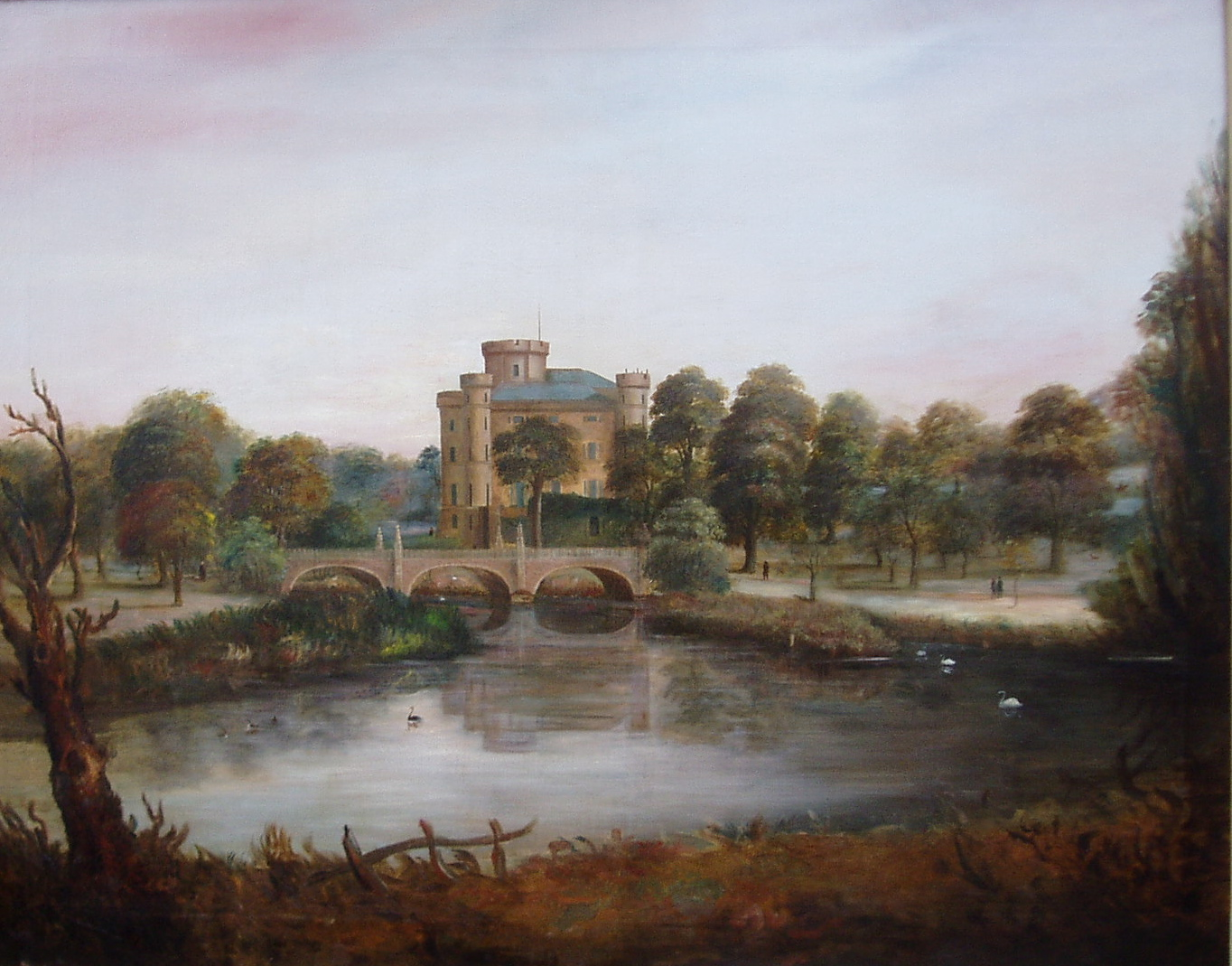
Seton's family seat, Eglinton Castle

He was born at the Clarendon Hotel, London. Seton may have been so named following his father being created Earl of Winton, a title previously held by the Seton family. His mother, Theresa Newcomen, born in Calcutta, was an illegitimate daughter of Thomas Gleadowe-Newcomen, 2nd Viscount Newcomen. Lady Theresa died in December 1853 and Seton's father remarried in 1858, his new wife being Lady Adela Caroline Harriet Capell (1828–1860), daughter of Arthur Capell, 6th Earl of Essex. Seton had two half-sisters through this marriage:

- Lady Sybil Amelia Montgomerie (died 3 February 1932)
- Lady Hilda Rose Montgomerie (died 18 June 1928)

Seton's older sister, Lady Egida Montgomerie (died 13 January 1880), married Frederick William Brook Thellusson, 5th Baron Rendlesham. His older brother was Archibald Montgomerie, who became the 14th Earl of Eglinton (3 December 1841 – 30 August 1892).

Seton had the rank of Lieutenant in the service of the Scots Fusilier Guards and married Nina Janet Bronwen Peers Williams, daughter of Lt.-Col. Thomas Peers Williams, on 11 June 1870.

Seton died in Windsor, aged 37, from the effects of diabetes. He would have inherited the title Earl of Eglinton if he had not died so young, and having only daughters who at the time were unable to inherit the property and title, his younger brother George (1848–1919) became the 15th Earl and George's son Archibald became the 16th Earl of Eglinton and Winton.

== Offspring ==
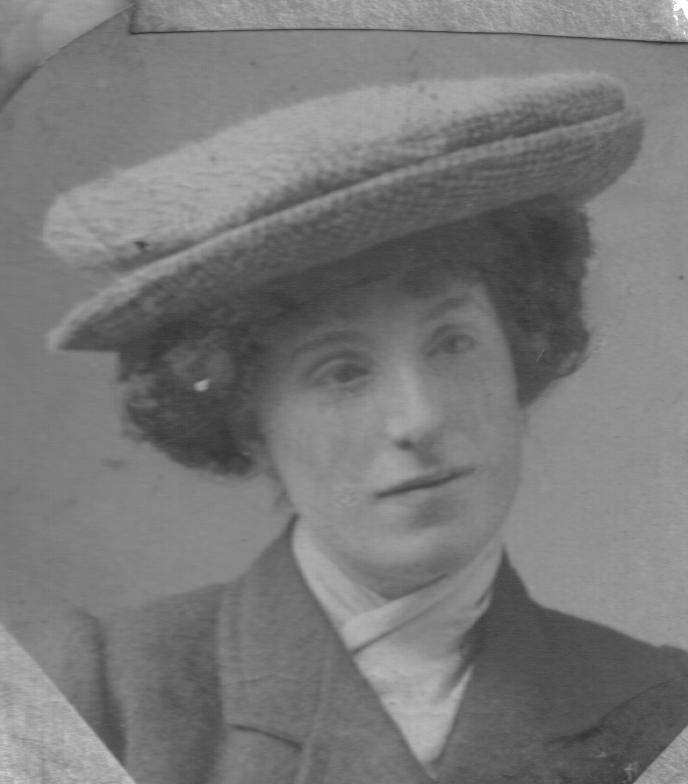
Alswen Montgomerie

Seton and Bronwen had three children:

- Alswen Dorothy Rose Montgomerie, died 23 December 1943
- Viva Seton Montgomerie, born 1879 and died 14 April 1959
- May Egida Montgomerie, born 4 April 1874 and died 2 December 1874

== Micro-history ==
His daughter Viva wrote two books; the first, published in 1914, was 'Sunny Days on the Riviera. Being a Diary of Some Sketching at Eze', illustrated with views of the Riviera by her sister Alswen. The second book was 'My Scrapbook of Memories', published in 1955 and containing references to Seton Montolieu Montgomerie, her mother and many Montgomerie family members.

== Family photographs ==
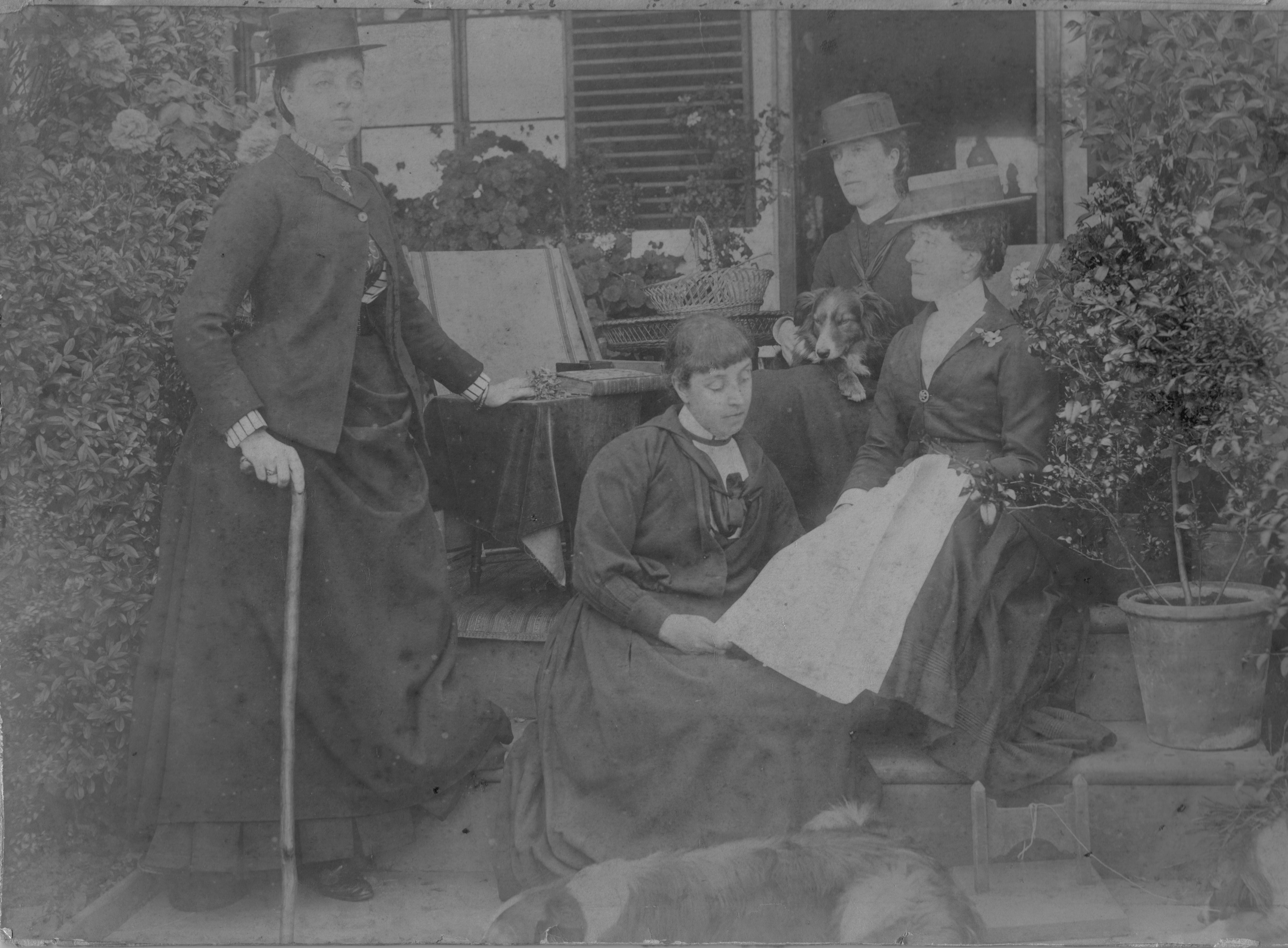
Seton's wife, Bronwen (with a dog on her lap), and her sisters Madge and Edith. The sister to the far left is Emily Gwendoline, known as Gwen, Lady Cowley.

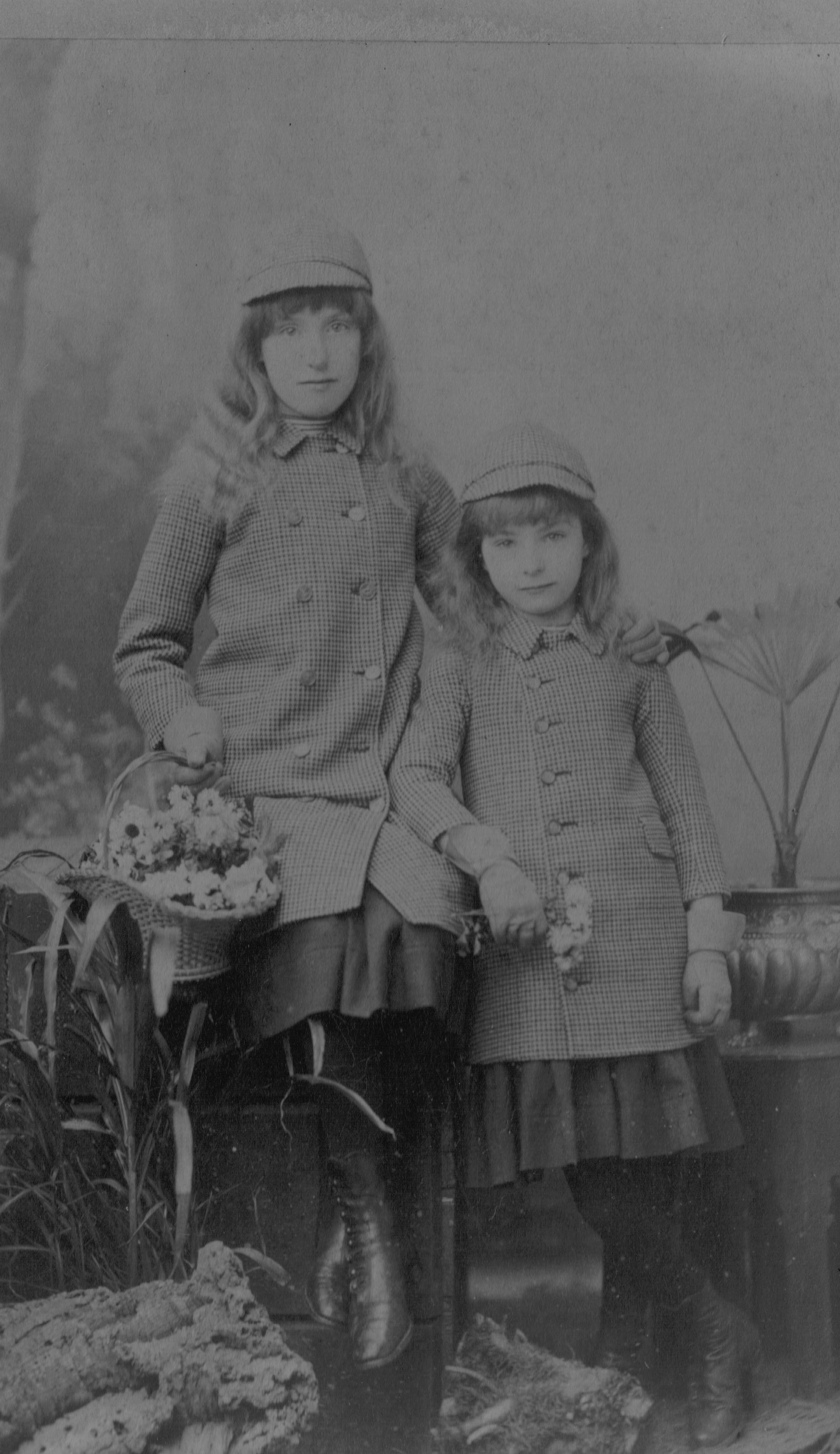
Alswen and Viva Montgomerie.

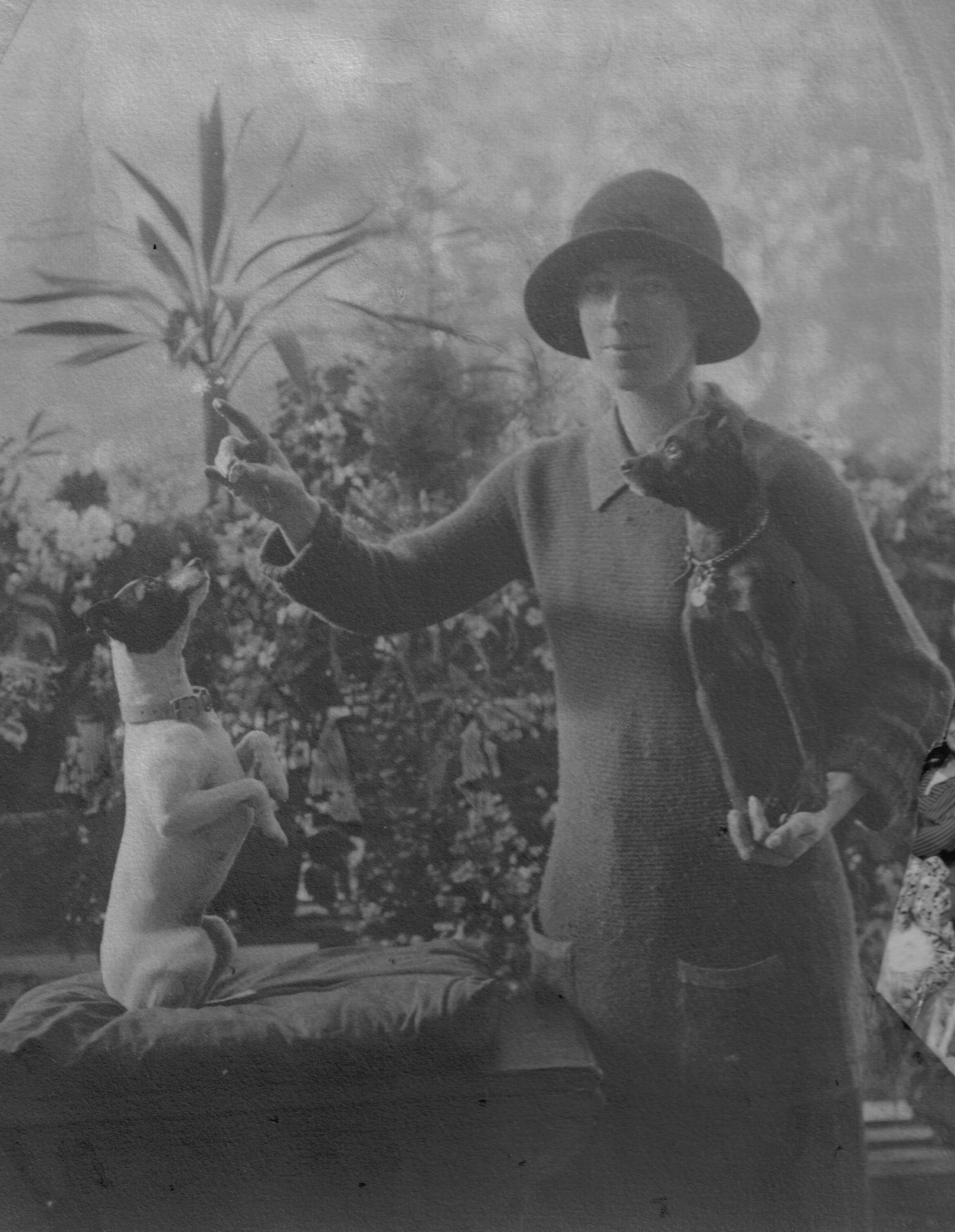
Viva Seton Montgomerie.

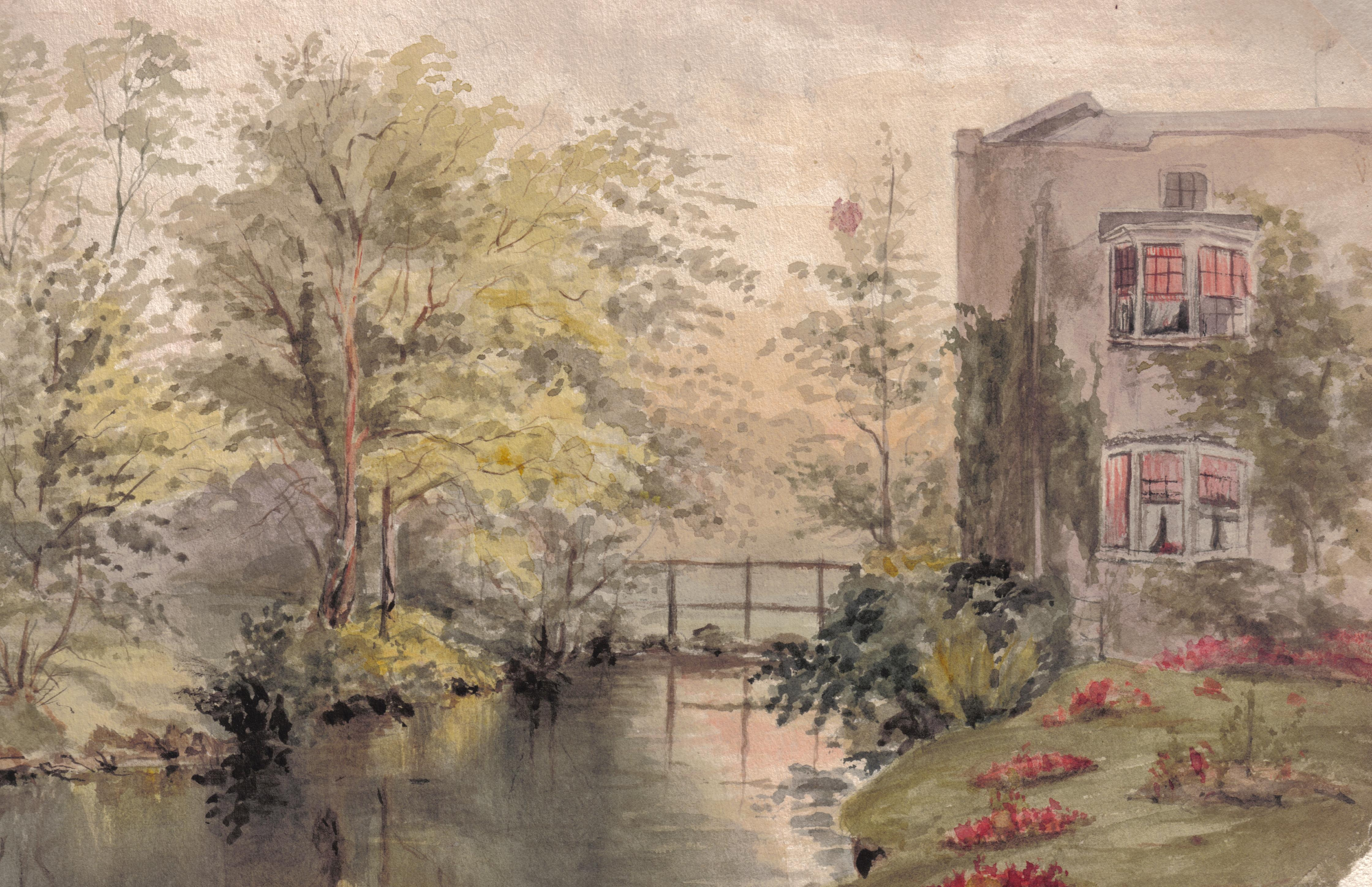
Sandleford Cottage [now called place], Newbury. Former home.

== See also ==
- Montgomery (name)
