= Shalford Preceptory =

Church building in Brimpton, Berkshire, England

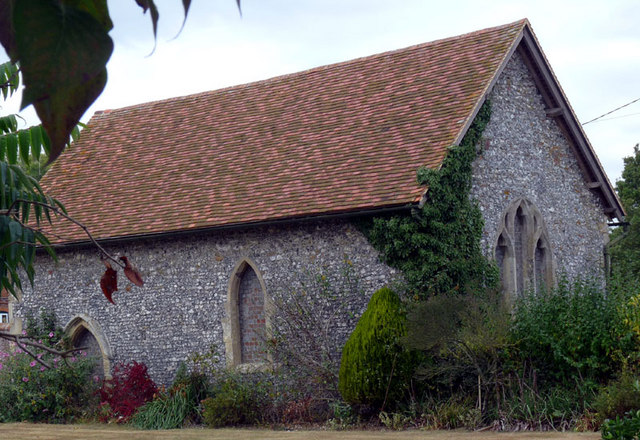
- The former chapel of Shalford Preceptory

- Location within Berkshire

General information
- Location: Brimpton, Berkshire, England
- Coordinates: 51.3783°N 1.1977°W
- Year built: c. 1198

Listed Building – Grade II*
- Official name: Chapel approximately 10 metres to east of Manor Farmhouse
- Designated: 6 April 1967
- Reference no.: 1303413

Shalford Preceptory was a preceptory of Knights Hospitaller at Shalford in the civil parish of Brimpton in the English county of Berkshire. It was established in the late 12th century. By 1338 it had merged with the preceptory at Greenham.

The chapel survives, though it was converted into a barn before 1614. It is a Grade II* listed building.

== See also ==
- Grade II* listed buildings in Berkshire
