= Sandleford =

Hamlet in Berkshire, England

Coordinates: 51.378°N 1.316°W

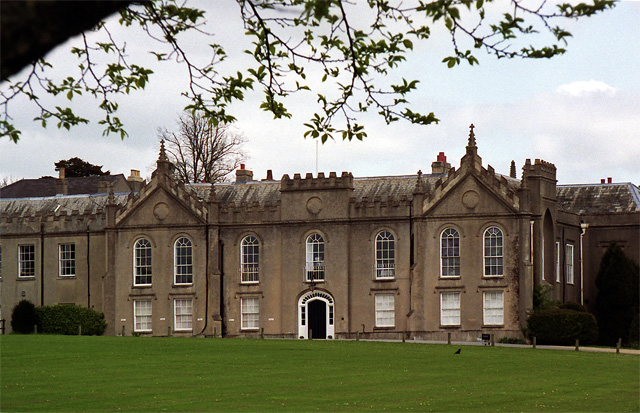
- Sandleford Priory

- Location within Berkshire
- OS grid reference: SU474643
- Civil parish: Greenham
- Unitary authority: West Berkshire
- Ceremonial county: Berkshire
- Region: South East
- Country: England
- Sovereign state: United Kingdom
- Post town: NEWBURY
- Postcode district: RG20
- Dialling code: 01635
- Police: Thames Valley
- Fire: Royal Berkshire
- Ambulance: South Central
- UK Parliament: Newbury

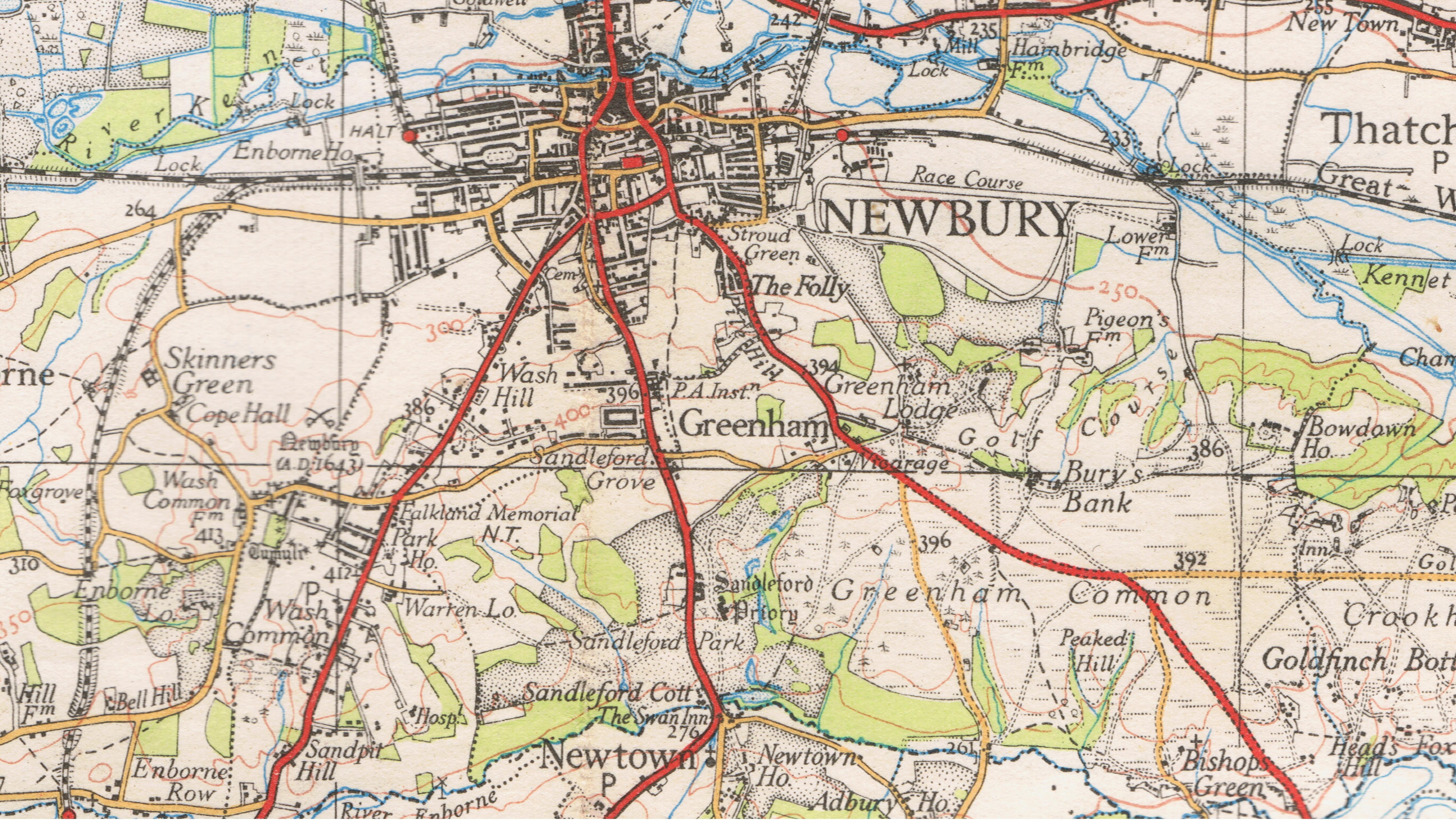
UK Ordnance Survey map, detail of Sandleford, 1939.

Sandleford is a hamlet in the civil parish of Greenham, in the West Berkshire of Berkshire, England. It adjoins the southern outskirts of the town of Newbury. Sandleford Priory was anciently a monastery, dissolved in 1478. The former monastery was largely rebuilt in the 18th century as a country house also called Sandleford Priory, incorporating the remains of some of the old monastery buildings. A civil parish called Sandford existed until 1934, when it was absorbed into the parish of Greenham.

== Geography ==
=== Landscape ===
The former civil parish of Sandleford contained about 520 acres, covering the parkland of the priory and adjoining farmland and woods generally lying to its west.

=== Population ===
A census taken in 1801 showed Sandleford to have three houses, three families and 18 people. At the same time Newbury comprised 931 houses, 34 empty houses, 971 families and 4275 people. John Marius Wilson in his Imperial Gazetteer of England and Wales, 1870–72, gave Sandleford as having Real property £775; of which £10 are in fisheries, and a population of 49 in nine houses, but in 1881 the population of Sandleford had shrunk to 34.

== History ==
=== Civil War ===
Plan of First Battle of Newbury, September 1643 (1877).

The Victorian historian Walter Money believed that, at the start of the First Battle of Newbury in September 1643, Prince Rupert of the Rhine lined up his cavalry at the western end of Sandleford estate, straddling the boundary with Wash Common and looking towards Enborne, although this is now disputed. After the battle, the line of march pursued by Robert Devereux, 3rd Earl of Essex back to Reading, was from the Wash, by Sandleford, over Greenham Common and via Theale.

=== Landowners ===
At time of the Domesday survey in 1086 Sandleford seems to have been a part of or belonged with Ulvitrone, aka Newbury, to Arnulf or Ernulf de Hesdin (1038-killed Antioch, 1097/98), son of Gerard IV of Hesdin by his wife Nesta ferch Gruffydd, a daughter of Gruffydd ap Llywelyn by Ealdgyth, daughter of Earl Ælfgar. Newbury was assessed to have had pannage for 50 hogs, much of this woodland will have been the wood called Brademore (Broadmoor) at Sandleford.

Richard Pinfold, one of 30 of the freeholders of Newbury in 1655, and sometime holder of the lease of the coppice named High Wood; John Kendrick, Warren farm which abuts the estate to the west was purchased for £250, out of the £4000 which Kendrick left Newbury in 1624. In addition the Kendrick charity had two closes on the west side of Newtown lane leased from the Dean & Canons, for 10l 10s per annum. Levi Smith (died 1703), Mayor of Newbury 1674 and 1693. Owned land in Greenham and along the Enborne at Peckmore in Greenham that abutted Sandleford and was later part of its demesne.

=== Administrative history ===
Whilst the monastery of Sandleford Priory existed, the chapel at the priory served some of the functions of a parish church for the locals. After the priory was dissolved in 1478 the former chapel ceased to serve that role, and Sandleford's status became ambiguous and subject to dispute. Matters came to a head in 1615, when the rector of Newbury pursued a court case arguing that Sandleford was liable to pay tithes and other parish taxes as part of the parish of Newbury, and also that an old pension of £8 per year which had been paid to Sandleford's landowners to maintain a priest to serve the locals should also pass to Newbury. The court ruled that Sandleford was not part of Newbury but a separate parish, albeit one without a church or priest. It was therefore not liable to pay tithes or other parish taxes to Newbury. However, the court did direct that the £8 per year pension should be paid to Newbury in return for the right to seats in Newbury church for Sandleford's residents.

Having been described as a parish with no church or priest in the 1615 court case, Sandleford was subsequently generally described as an extra-parochial area. In 1759 the rector of Newbury, Thomas Penrose, in answer to some set questions about Newbury including one on 'seats of gentry', wrote that Newbury had No seat of gentry; if you except Sandleford, which is an estate held of the church of Windsor, and which is often considered as extra-parochial, but which pays a composition in lieu of tithes to the rector of Newbury. It is situated to the south of Newbury. The present lessee is Edward Montagu, Esq.; Member of Parliament for the town of Huntingdon.

Such extra-parochial areas were made civil parishes in 1858. The civil parish was abolished in 1934, when most of its area was absorbed into the neighbouring parish of Greenham, subject to a minor adjustment to the boundary with Newbury. At the 1931 census (the last before the abolition of the parish), Sandleford had a population of 30.

== Notable buildings ==
=== Sandleford Priory ===
==== Monastery ====
Inclusa of Sandraford, as mentioned in a pipe roll of 26 Henry II, 1179–80. Otherwise known as an anchoress, a female Anchorite, a withdrawn holy person;

Sandleford was a priory of Austin canons, founded between 1193 and 1202 by Geoffrey, 4th count of Perch, and Richenza-Matilda his wife. A confirmation charter from Archbishop Stephen indicates the priory was dedicated to St John the Baptist and endowed with all the lands of Sandleford. The appropriation of the priory, on 9 March 1478, to the Dean and Canons of Windsor was mainly owing to Bishop Beauchamp of Salisbury, who was Dean of Windsor from 1478 to 1481. By this time it appears the religious had forsaken the priory. The chapel of Sandleford Priory (1200–1478) was incorporated into a later country house.

==== Country house ====
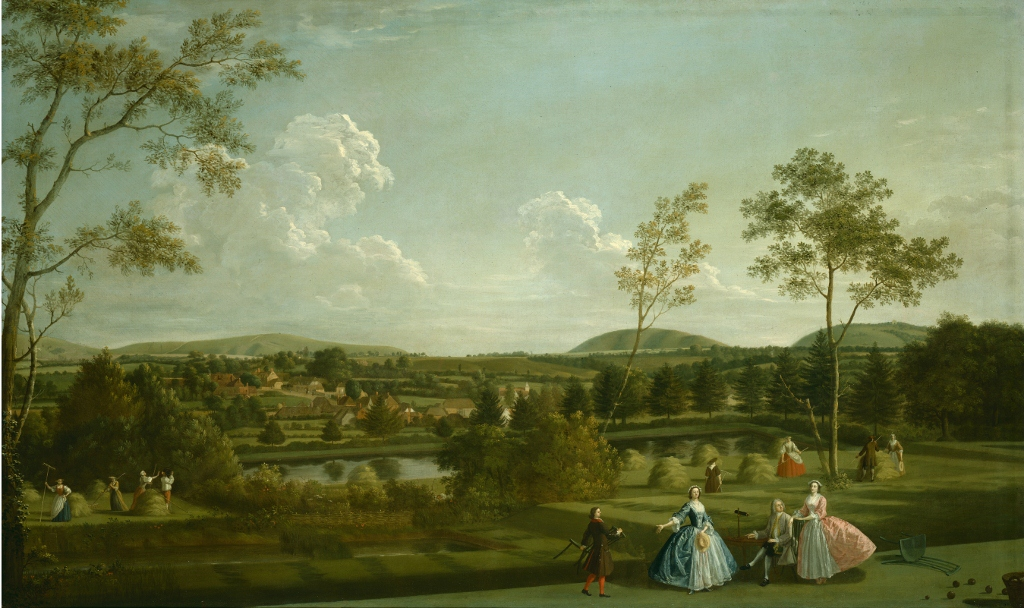
Edward Haytley's portrait, The Montagu Family at Sandleford Priory, circa 1744.

The present Sandleford Priory is a Grade I listed building in 54 acres (22 ha) of parkland landscaped by Capability Brown. It was erected around the old priory buildings between 1780 and 1786 by James Wyatt, for Elizabeth Montagu, the social reformer, patron of the arts, salonist, literary critic and writer who helped organise and lead the Blue Stockings Society. It was later inherited by her nephew, Matthew Montagu, 4th Baron Rokeby. Her friend Hannah More was there often and described it in 1784. Other wealthy citizens that it was leased to during the 17th, 18th and 19th centuries, these included:

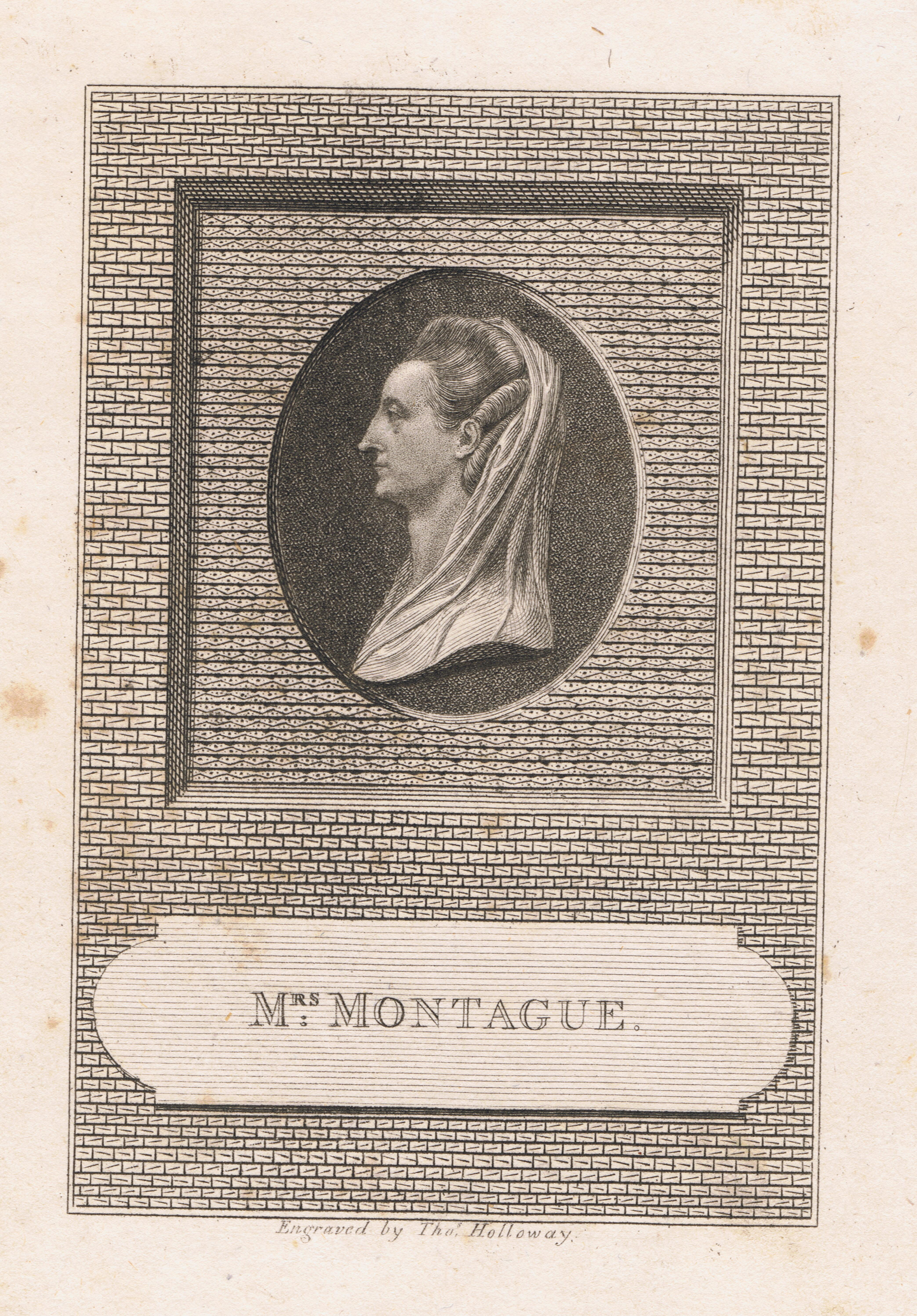
Mrs. Montagu, engraved by Thomas Holloway, published by John Sewell (died 1802), 32 Cornhill, London, 1785.

- John and Henry Kingsmill, from c. 1685 and 1706 and 1710, until circa 1715–1717. John Kingsmill, JP (Newbury, 1685) was a younger son of Sir Henry Kingsmill (1587–1625), and husband to Rachael daughter of JP and sometime MP Edward Pitt (c.1592–1643), of Steepleton Iwerne, Dorset and later of Stratfield Saye (which he bought for £4,800 in 1629), by Rachael (d. 1643) daughter of Sir George Morton, Bart., son of Sir William Pitt, kt. 1618, Comptroller of the Household. Their sons Robert and Henry Kingsmill died without issue in 1697 and 1710. George Pitt the brother of Rachel Pitt, Mrs John Kingsmill, married Jane, the daughter of John Savage, 2nd Earl Rivers; Anne Finch, Countess of Winchilsea, daughter of Sir William Kingsmill of Sydmonton Court, was a niece and first cousin.
- William Cradock (died 1736), of Gainford Hall, Gainsford, Durham. He married in 1715 Mary daughter of Gilbert Sheldon of St. Andrew's, Holborn, and bought the lease in 1717, disposing of it in 1729;
- Edward Montagu, grandson of Edward Montagu, 1st Earl of Sandwich, leaseholder from 1730, married Elizabeth Robinson in 1742. Sandleford had been in possession of the first cousin (Rachael Pitt, Mrs John Kingsmill) of his first cousin (Sir Edward Wortley-Montagu (1678 –1761), the father of Lady Mary Wortley Montagu);
- Matthew Montagu (1762–1831), MP, 4th Baron Rokeby;
- Edward Montagu, the 5th Baron Rokeby, who parted with the lease in 1835, to William Chatteris, and died in 1847;
- William Pollet Brown Chatteris (1810–1889), JP, DL (1852, Berks), educated at Brasenose College, Oxford, and son of a London banker, who eventually bought the freehold, enfranchised the estate, in 1875 from the Dean and Canons of Windsor. His first wife (married 1833) was Anne eldest daughter of Alexander Arbuthnot, Bishop of Killaloe;
- Chatteris' nephew Alpin Macgregor (died 1899) son of Sir John Atholl Macgregor, bart., nephew of Chatteris' second wife, daughter of Admiral Sir Thomas Masterman Hardy;
- Macgregor's niece Miss Agatha Thynne (died 1962), (descended from Thomas Thynne, 2nd Marquess of Bath), wife of the 3rd Baron Hindlip. Her mother (died 1934) and father John Charles Thynne (1838–1918), sometime receiver general to the Dean and Chapter of Westminster, were living at Sandleford Cottage in 1907. Her sister Joan E. M. (1872–1945) was the mother of John Campbell, 5th Earl Cawdor.
- Mrs. Myers, aka Evelyn Elizabeth Myers, who wrote A History of Sandleford Priory, with plates, Newbury District Field Club, Special Publication. no. 1, published between 1900 and 1931, was tenant from before 1898 to at least 1911
- Major Aubrey Isaac Rothwell Butler, (1878-27.9.1930), son of Isaac Butler (1839–1917), JP (Sheriff of Monmouth 1910), of Panteg House, Griffithstown, Torfaen, near Newport. It is claimed that the first sheet steel in Britain was rolled in Staffordshire in 1876 from a bloom made in Panteg by Isaac Butler. Aubrey Butler was sometime manager of Baldwin's Ltd branches in Monmouth & Midlands, Baldwins having taken over the family firm, Wright, Butler and Co Ltd, in 1902. Later he was Sheriff of Monmouthshire, 1924, and by the time of his early death was described as formerly of Sandleford Priory and of 13, Porchester Terrace, London.

The house is now home to St Gabriel's School.

=== Sandleford Place ===
This house, formerly known has both Sandleford Cottage and Sandleford Lodge, sits on the southern boundary of the old parish, by the River Enborne, on the Berkshire and Hampshire, and Sandleford and Newtown border. Its former residents have included:

- John Deane, from circa 1624;
- Mrs Colman;
- Henry Hart Millman, divine, whose wife Mary Anne was a daughter of Lt-general William Cockell (died 1831) of Sandleford Lodge;
- Robert Fellowes (1817–1915), of Shotesham, and his sister Louisa Fellowes (1817–1901), were both born at Sandleford Cottage, the seat of their father Robert (1779–1869). Later she married Sir Thomas Gladstone, Bt. (and thus sister-in-law of William Gladstone the Prime Minister). They were children of Robert Fellowes (1779–1869) by his second wife Jane Louisa Sheldon, daughter of the MP for Wilton (1804–1822) Colonel Ralph Sheldon (1741–1822), of Donnington Cottage, near Newbury, Berkshire, and grandchildren of Robert Fellowes (1742–1829), of Shotesham, MP for Norwich. Their younger sister was Baroness Sandhurst (1827–1892), a philanthropist and suffagist. Robert Fellowes is a direct ancestor of Lord Fellowes.

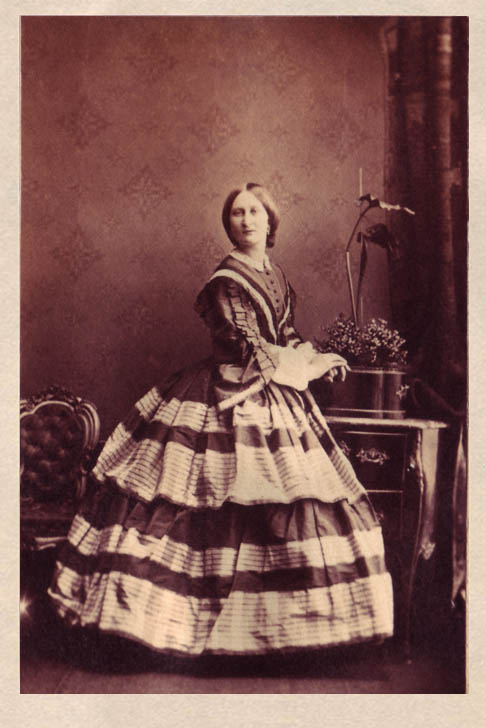
Lady Louisa Anne Magenis (1837–1918), carte de visite, by Camille Silvy, 1861.

- The 1861 census lists at Sandleford Lodge, Lady Louisa Anne Magenis (1837–1918), daughter of Armar Lowry-Corry, 3rd Earl Belmore, and her husband (they married in 1860) Major Richard Henry Magenis (Mauritius, 1832 – Abington, 1880). Magenis was the grandson of Colonel Richard Magenis (married 1788) by his wife Lady Elizabeth-Anne Cole (1765–1807 or 1808), daughter of William Cole, 1st Earl of Enniskillen and sister of General Sir Galbraith Lowry Cole, GCB, KCB, Governor of Mauritius 1823–1828. Richard Henry Magenis was J.P. for Counties Antrim and Cambridgeshire, High Sheriff of Antrim 1868, and Representative of the Viscounts Magenis (attainted 1691), with later addresses at Abington Hall, Cambridge; and Finvoy Lodge, Co. Antrim.

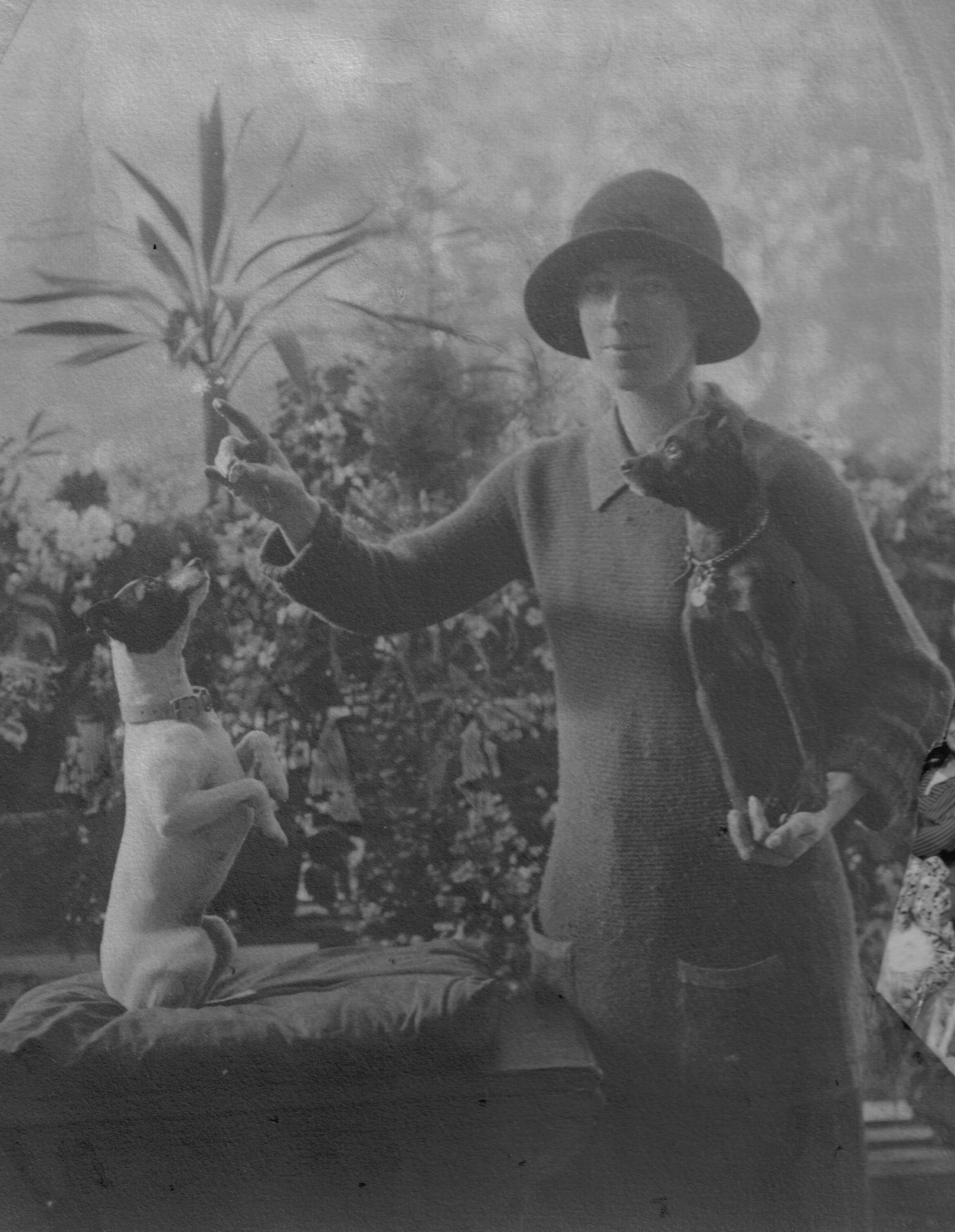
Viva Seton Montgomerie (1879–1959).

- William Frederick Hicks-Beach (1841–1923), MP, was living at Sandleford lodge in 1869 and by 1871 he is recorded as having with him a wife and four children, and eight staff.
- Mrs. Wedderburn (1825–), aka Selina Mary Garth, daughter of Captain Thomas Garth, RN, of Haines Hill, Hurst, Berkshire, and widow of Frederick Lewis Scrymgeour-Wedderburn (1808–1874), de jure 8th Earl of Dundee, and her daughters Charlotte and Selina Elgiva, (1856–), were living at Sandleford Lodge, c. 1881 and 1883;
- Brigadier Wyndham Torr, CMG, DSO, MC, (1890–1963) of Sandleford Place; soldier in WW1; military attache Madrid, Lisbon, Washington, Spain, etc.;
- Seton Montolieu Montgomerie (1846–1883), and his wife Mrs. Montgomerie, aka Nina Janet Bronwen Peers Williams (daughter of Thomas Peers Williams, MP), of Sandleford cottage (later renamed place), and their daughters Viva and Alswen.
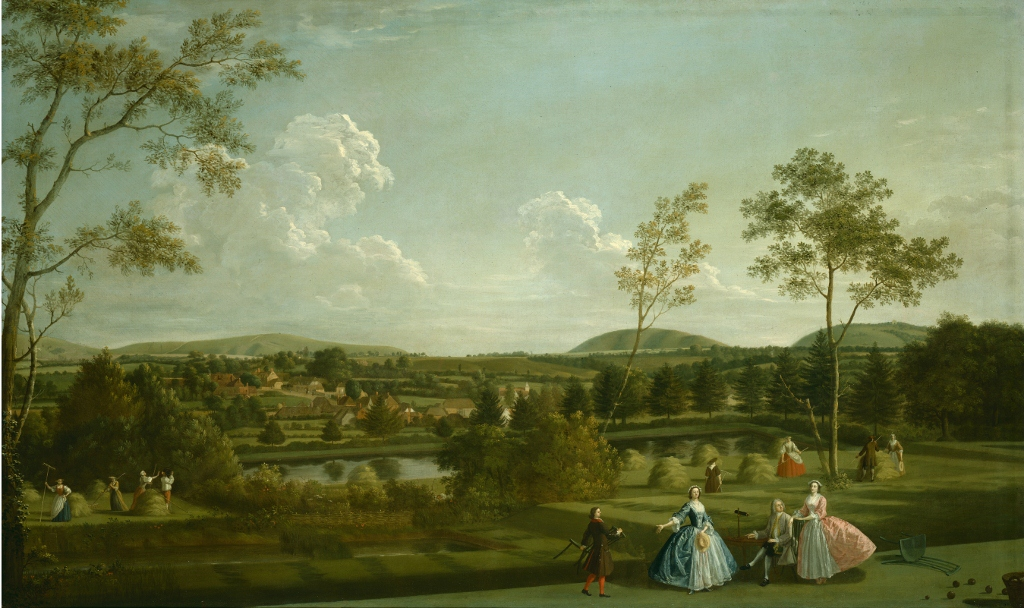
Edward Haytley's portrait, The Montagu Family at Sandleford Priory, circa 1744.

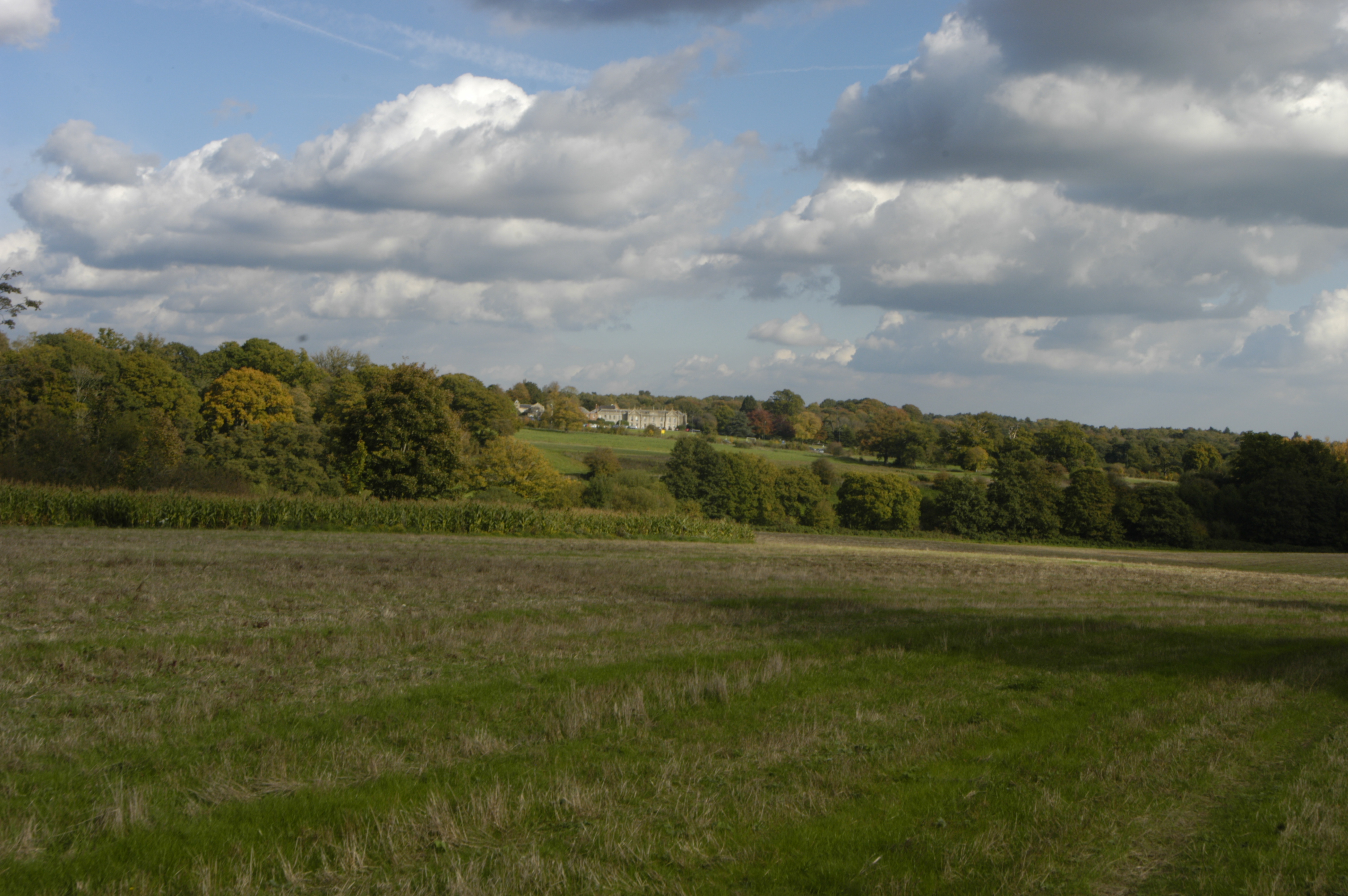
Sandleford Priory from the west, from the drive that connected the priory to the Andover road (A343), as seen between Dirty Ground Copse and Gorse Covert.

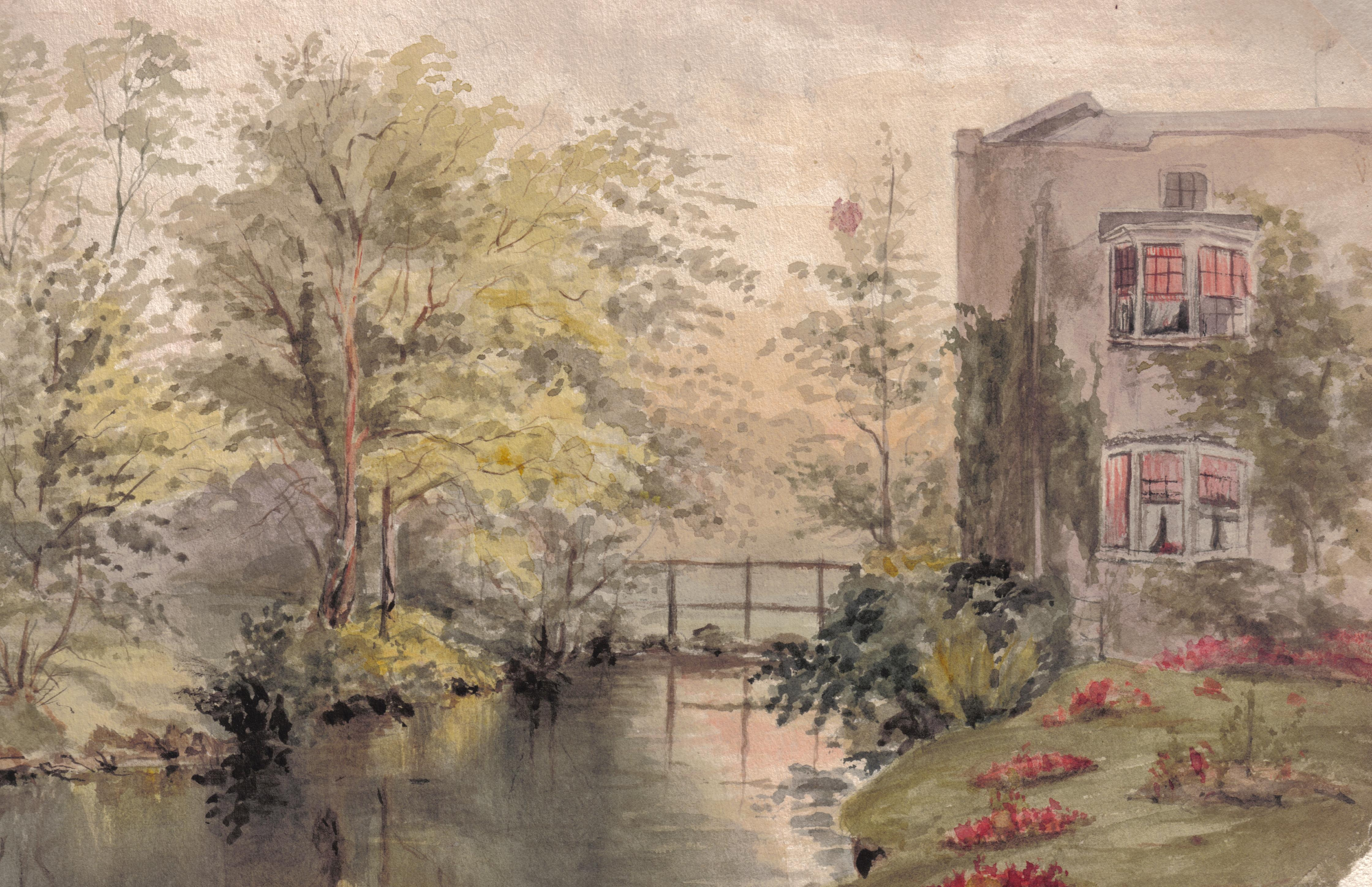
Sandleford Cottage, former home of Seton Montolieu Montgomerie and her daughters Viva and Alswen.

=== Sandleford Grove ===
James Asprey, Esq., maltster, (Highclere, 1811–1893), of Sandleford Grove, exhibited white trump wheat grown on very poor soil, weight 67 Lbs per bushel, at the Great Exhibition of 1851.

=== Sandleford Farm ===
King James I, was leased Sandleford farm by the Dean and Canons of Windsor, January 1605. The other present owners and directors of Sandleford Farm partnership and Skilldraw Ltd include Nicholas Laing (c. 15%), of the family that made McVitie's, and father of TV's Made in Chelsea star Jamie Laing; Delia Norgate, widow of the founder of Trencherwood Homes, John Norgate; and Noel Gibbs a descendant of William Gibbs of Tyntesfield, and of Sir Frederick Wills, 1st Baronet.

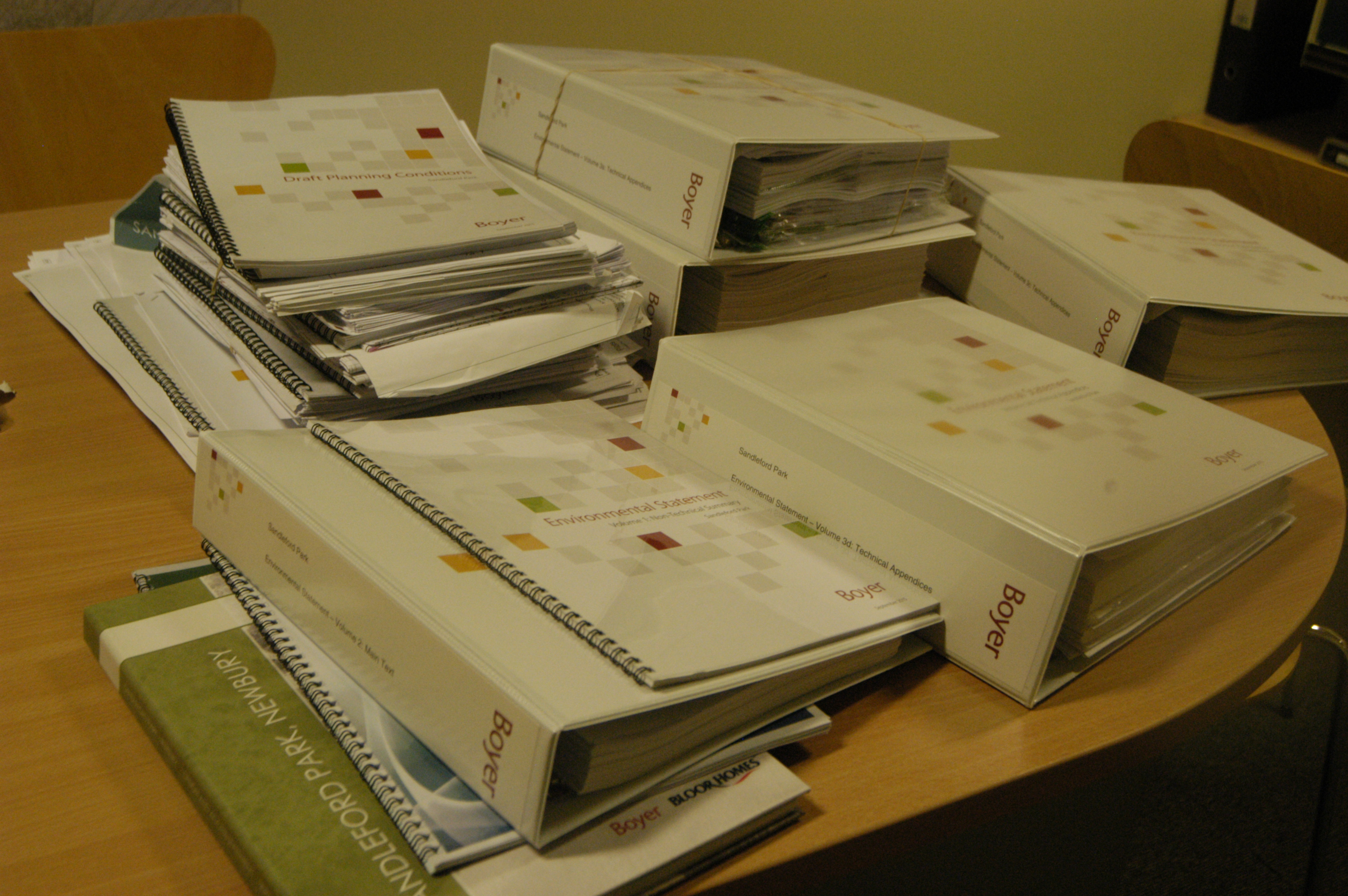
Files regarding seeking planning permission at Sandleford, West Berkshire Council offices, January 2016.

On 30 September 1986, the circa 470 acre Sandleford Farm, was sold by Neate's, with help from Knight Frank & Rutley, at the Chequers Hotel, Newbury, for over two million pounds.

== Literature ==
Mrs. Elizabeth Montagu, the distinguished Bluestocking, who lived at Sandleford Priory from 1742 until her death in 1800 wrote from and mentioned Sandleford in dozens of her of letters.

The original home of the rabbits in Richard Adams' novel Watership Down was at Sandleford.
