= Kintbury Abbey =

Possible abbey in Berkshire, England

Coordinates: 51.4008°N 1.4505°W

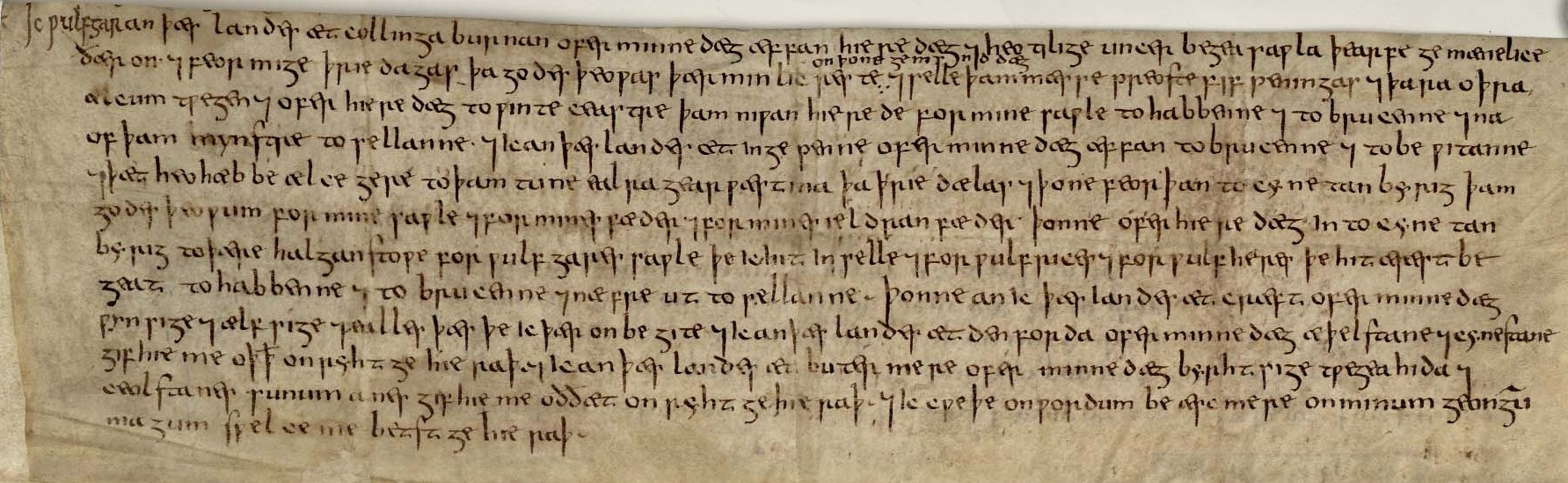
Will of Wulfgar, AD 931–939, granting land in Inkpen to the "holy place" (halgan stowe) at Kintbury (Cynetanbyrig)

Kintbury Abbey was a supposed Anglo-Saxon monastery at Kintbury in the English county of Berkshire. It was planned to refound it in 1147, but this never came to fruition.

The only reference to this place is in the will of a thegn named Wulfgar, made in AD 931. In this, he gave the village of Inkpen to “the servants of God at Kentbury and the Holy Place there”. Saxon remains found near St Mary's Church may indicate the site.

In 1147, Robert de Beaumont, 2nd Earl of Leicester planned to found a convent of Benedictine nuns, south of the River Kennet at Holt in Kintbury parish, but progression was slow and the grant was eventually transferred to the nuns at Nuneaton in Warwickshire.
