= Brimpton Pit =

Protected area in Berkshire, England

- Site of Special Scientific Interest
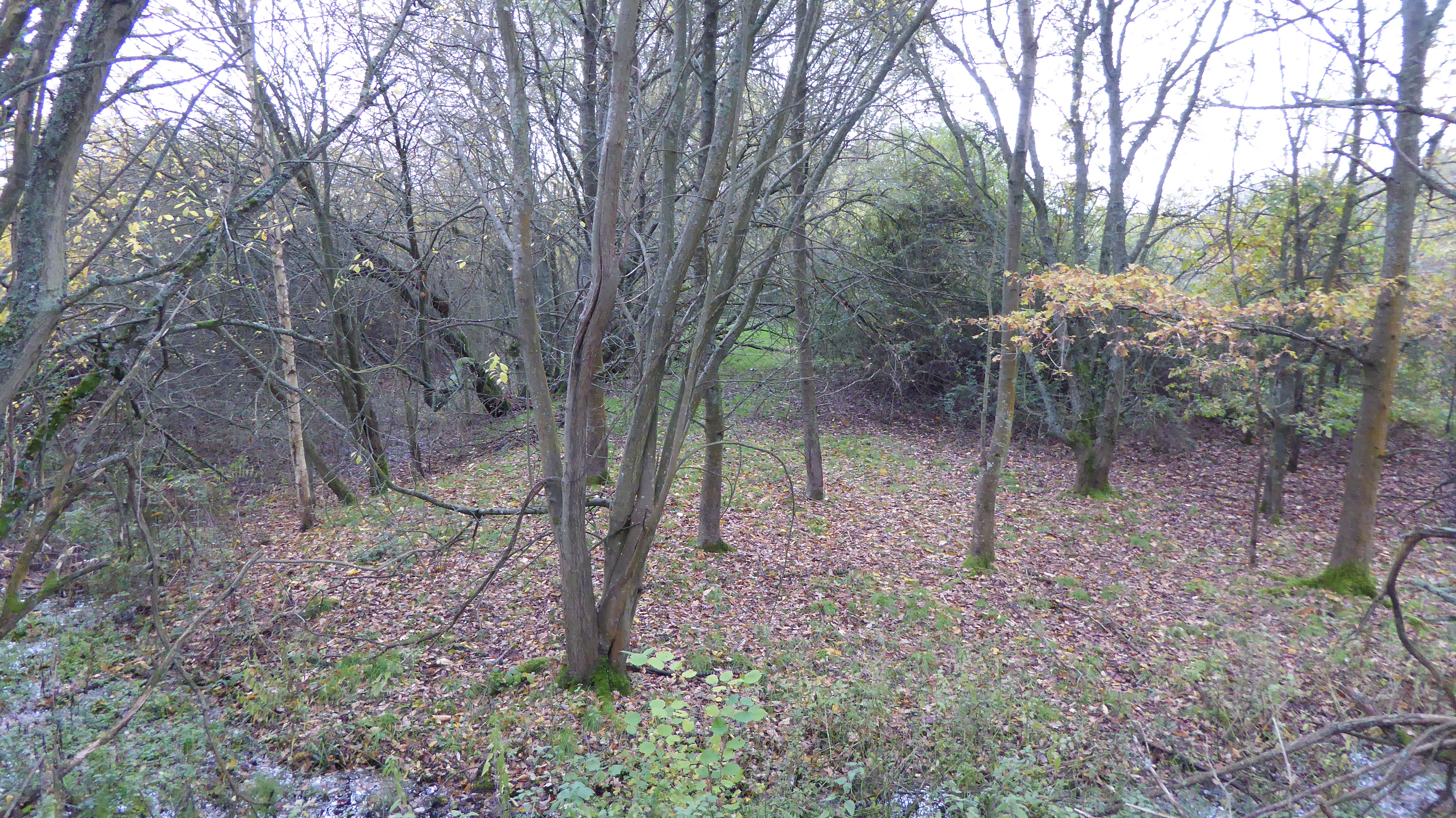
- Location of Brimpton Pit.
- Area of search: Berkshire
- Grid reference: SU 565 650
- Coordinates: 51.381°N 1.190°W
- Interest: Geological
- Area: 1.6 hectares (4.0 acres)
- Notification date: 1984
- Location map: Magic Map

Brimpton Pit is a 1.6-hectare (4.0-acre) geological Site of Special Scientific Interest west of Aldermaston in Berkshire. It is a Geological Conservation Review site.

This former gravel pit contains fossil molluscs and pollen which were laid down during a warm phase 80,000 years ago which was first recognised at this site, and is called the Brimpton Interstadial (Marine Isotope Stage 5a). The pit is also important for helping to understand the development of the River Thames and its tributaries.

A footpath runs along the side of this site, but no geology is visible. The western half is part of a field and the eastern half is a dip in an area of wood and scrub.
