= Greenham Preceptory =

Preceptory in Berkshire, England

Coordinates: 51.378799°N 1.280766°W

Greenham Preceptory was a preceptory of Knights Hospitaller at Greenham in the English county of Berkshire.

The preceptory was established in 1199 and dissolved in 1540. There are no remains today. It is believed to have been located in the northern part of Greenham tithing, in Thatcham parish, that was given to Newbury in 1878.
