= Matthew Montagu, 4th Baron Rokeby =

British politician & Baron (1762–1831)

The Right Honourable The Lord Rokeby FRS

Member of Parliament for St Germans
- In office 1806–1812 Serving with Sir Joseph Yorke, Charles Philip Yorke
- Preceded by: James Langham; Lord Binning
- Succeeded by: Hon. James Stuart; Henry Goulburn

Member of Parliament for Tregony
- In office 1790–1796 Serving with John Stephenson, Hon. Robert Stewart
- Preceded by: Robert Kingsmill; Lord Hugh Seymour
- Succeeded by: John Nicholls; Sir Lionel Copley, Bt

Member of Parliament for Bossiney
- In office 1786–1790 Serving with Hon. Charles Stuart
- Preceded by: Hon. Charles Stuart; Bamber Gascoyne
- Succeeded by: Hon. James Stuart; Humphrey Minchin

Personal details
- Born: Matthew Robinson; 23 November 1762 London, England
- Died: 1 September 1831 (aged 68) Montagu House, Portman Square
- Spouse: Elizabeth Charlton (m. 1785; died 1817)
- Relations: Matthew Robinson, 2nd Baron Rokeby (uncle); Morris Robinson, 3rd Baron Rokeby (brother); Elizabeth Montagu (aunt)
- Parent(s): Morris Robinson; Jane Greenland
- Education: Harrow School
- Alma mater: Trinity College, Cambridge

Matthew Montagu, 4th Baron Rokeby (23 November 1762 – 1 September 1831), FRS, known as Matthew Robinson until 1776, was a British Member of Parliament, and briefly a baronet and Peer of the Realm.

== Early life ==
Montagu was born Matthew Robinson on 23 November 1762 and was baptised in the parish of St Andrew Holborn. He was the second son of Jane (née Greenland) Robinson and Morris Robinson, an attorney of the Six Clerks Office in Chancery of London. He was the younger brother of Morris Robinson, 3rd Baron Rokeby and nephew of Matthew Robinson, 2nd Baron Rokeby.

He was the favoured nephew of Elizabeth (Robinson) Montagu (widow of Edward Montagu, grandson of the Edward Montagu, 1st Earl of Sandwich), at whose request he took the name of Montagu on 3 June 1776 by Royal Licence in advance of inheriting her estate at Sandleford Priory in Berkshire and elsewhere.

He was educated at Harrow School from 1775 to 1780 and Trinity College, Cambridge in 1780.

== Career ==
A "faithful follower of Pitt", Montagu represented the Cornish constituencies of Bossiney (1786–1790) and Tregony (1790–1795) in the Parliament of Great Britain; and St Germans (1806–1812) in the Parliament of the United Kingdom.

Montagu was a friend and supporter of William Wilberforce, and thus favoured the abolition of the slave trade. Wilberforce stayed at Sandleford from 27th to the 28th of July, 1789:

27th. Set off for Bath and reached Sandleford. The old lady [Elizabeth Montagu] wonderfully spirited, are all very kind in their reception. 28th. Almost compelled to stay with the Montagus all day. Mrs. Montagu senior has many fine, and great, and amiable qualities. Young Montagu all gratitude and respect and affection to her and of most upright and pure intentions.

Wilberforce was at Sandleford one night in July 1791:

Monday 28 July. Off betimes on Sierra Leone business-reached Sandleford (M. Montagu's) in the evening. Dr. Beattie was already arrived.

During a debate in the British House of Commons on 27 February 1807 over the proposed Slave Trade Act 1807, which would abolish British involvement in the Atlantic slave trade, Montagu stated his support for the act and asked

one of the opposers of the bill, who was a member of the board of aldermen of London, whether he would think it a happy change, to be snatched away from one of the city banquets, and crammed into a slave ship as the blacks were?

In 1829, he succeeded his brother as 4th Baron Rokeby in the Irish peerage and the 6th Baronet of Rokeby Park.

=== Fellow of the Royal Society ===
Montagu was elected a fellow in 1795. His proposers were Arden, Lucas Pepys, J. Rennell, John Sinclair, G. Shuckburgh Evelyn, William Marsden, George, 16th Earl of Morton, Pat Russell, George Atwood, John Henniker Major, and C. F. Greville.

== Personal life ==
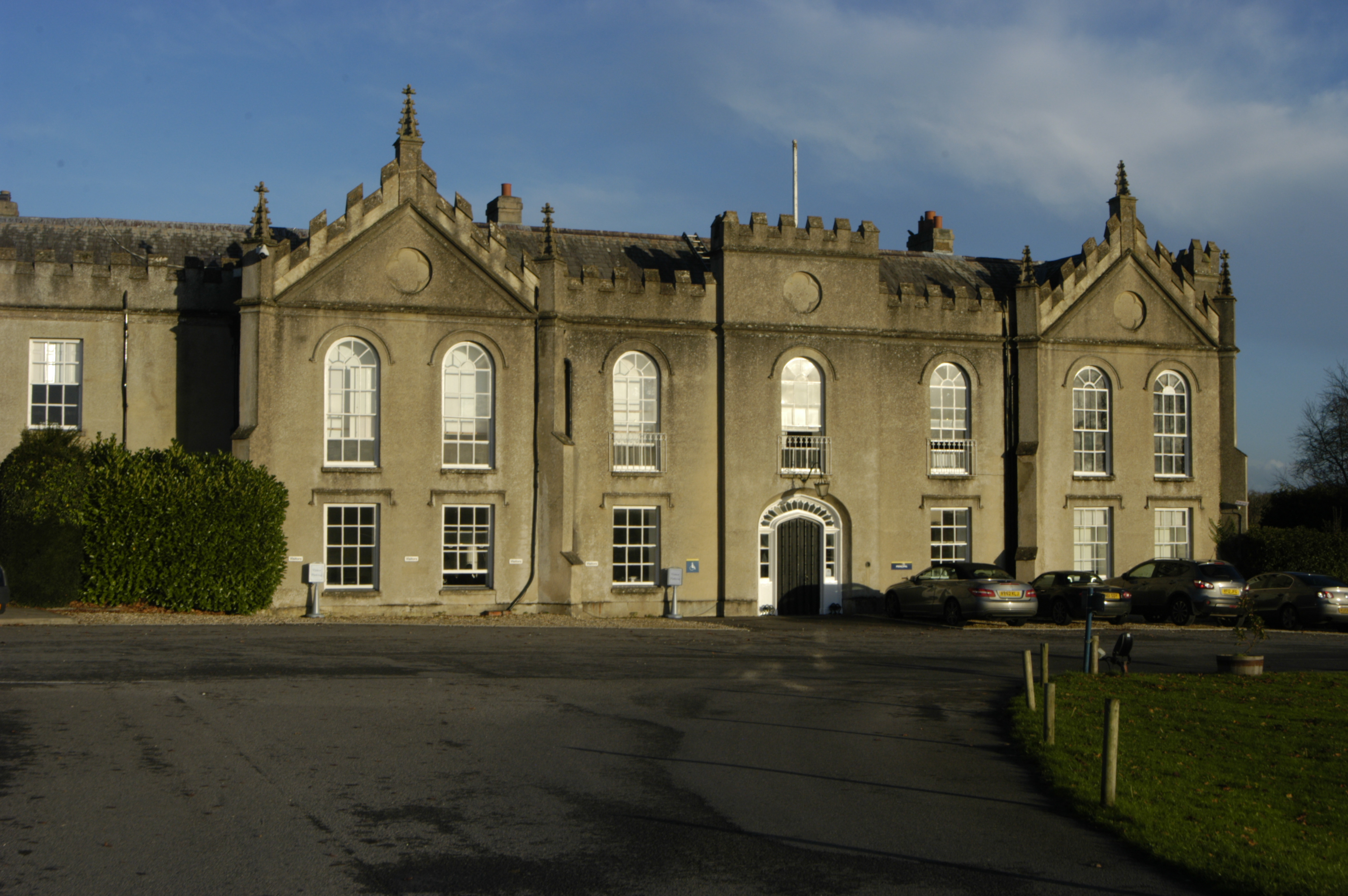
Sandleford Priory (west front). Montagu inherited the lease from his renowned aunt.

On 9 July 1785, Montagu married Elizabeth Charlton, daughter and heir of Francis Charlton of Kent. Before her death, they had six sons and seven daughters, including:

- Edward Montagu, 5th Baron Rokeby (1787–1847), who died unmarried in Naples.
- Henry Robinson-Montagu, 6th Baron Rokeby (1798–1883), who married Magdalen (née Huxley) Croft, the daughter of Thomas Huxley and widow of Frederick Croft.
- Hon. John Montagu (d. 1848), a Lieutenant-Colonel in the Coldstream Guards.
- Hon. Elizabeth Montagu (d. 1875), who married Charles Oldfield Bowles, son of Oldfield Bowles, in 1815.
- Hon. Catherine Montagu (d. 1865), who married Edward Goulburn, son of Munbee Goulburn and Hon. Susannah Chetwynd (a daughter of the 4th Viscount Chetwynd), in 1831.
- Hon. Spencer Dudley Montagu (1807–1882), a cricketer who married Anna Louisa Flint, a daughter of Sir C. W. Flint, in 1842. They divorced and he then married Henrietta Elizabeth Harriet Pemberton, a daughter of C. R. Pemberton, in 1868.
- Hon. Caroline Montagu (d. 1867), who married William Godolphin Osborne, son of Francis Osborne, 1st Baron Godolphin, in 1843.
- Hon. Jane Montagu (d. 1857), who married politician Henry Goulburn, also a son of Munbee Goulburn and Hon. Susannah Chetwynd, in 1811.
- Hon. Mary Montagu (d. 1877), who married Col. Robert Ellison of the Grenadier Guards in 1820.
- Hon. Eleanor Montagu (d. 1847), who married politician John-Nicholas Fazakerley in 1822.
- Hon. Emily Montague (d. 1832), who died unmarried.

His wife died on died 7 March 1817, before he succeeded to the barony. Lord Rokeby died at Montagu House, Portman Square on 1 September 1831. He was succeeded in his titles by his eldest son, Edward. Upon Edward's death in Naples in 1847, the titles passed to his younger son Henry upon whose death the baronetcy and barony became extinct.

Parliament of Great Britain
Preceded by Hon. Charles Stuart; Bamber Gascoyne	Member of Parliament for Bossiney; 1786–1790; With: Hon. Charles Stuart	Succeeded by Hon. James Archibald Stuart; Humphrey Minchin
Preceded by Robert Kingsmill; Lord Hugh Seymour	Member of Parliament for Tregony; 1790–1796; With: John Stephenson 1790–94; Hon. Robert Stewart 1794–96	Succeeded by John Nicholls; Sir Lionel Copley, Bt
Parliament of the United Kingdom
Preceded by James Langham; Lord Binning	Member of Parliament for St Germans; 1806–1812; With: Sir Joseph Yorke 1806–10; Charles Philip Yorke 1810–12	Succeeded by Hon. James Archibald Stuart; Henry Goulburn
Peerage of Ireland
Preceded by Morris Robinson	Baron Rokeby; 1829–1831	Succeeded by Edward Montagu
