= Morris Robinson, 3rd Baron Rokeby =

British politician (1757–1829)

The Right Honourable The Lord Rokeby

Member of Parliament for Boroughbridge
- In office 1790–1796 Serving with Sir Richard Sutton, Bt
- Preceded by: Sir Richard Sutton, Bt; The Viscount Palmerston
- Succeeded by: Francis Burdett; Sir John Scott

Personal details
- Born: Morris Robinson; 14 July 1757 London, England
- Died: 10 May 1829 (aged 71) Thornby, Leyburn, York
- Relations: Matthew Robinson, 2nd Baron Rokeby (uncle); Matthew Montagu, 4th Baron Rokeby (brother)
- Parent(s): Morris Robinson; Jane Greenland
- Education: Trinity Hall, Cambridge

Morris Robinson, 3rd Baron Rokeby (14 July 1757 – 10 May 1829), was a British politician.

== Early life ==
Robinson was born on 14 July 1757 and was baptised in the parish of St Andrew Holborn. He was the eldest son of Jane (née Greenland) Robinson and Morris Robinson, an attorney of the Six Clerks Office in Chancery of London. His paternal aunt was the reformer Elizabeth Robinson Montagu (who married Edward Montagu, grandson of the Edward Montagu, 1st Earl of Sandwich). His maternal grandfather was John Greenland, of Lovelace, Kent.

He was educated at Trinity Hall, Cambridge from 1775 to 1777 and also entered Lincoln's Inn to study law in 1775.

== Career ==
He was brought into Parliament by the 2nd Duke of Newcastle for Boroughbridge, and was expected to support Pitt's administration. Lord Rokeby, who ended up opposing Pitt over his perceived neglecting of the Navy and "opposed Pitt’s measures against treason and sedition in limine", held the seat until 1796.

In 1800 he succeeded his uncle, the eccentric Matthew Robinson, 2nd Baron Rokeby, in the barony and his estates. This was an Irish peerage and, therefore, did not entitle him to a seat in the House of Lords. The barony had been created in 1777 for Lord Archbishop of Armagh Richard Robinson, the Lord Primate of All Ireland, who had also inherited the English baronetcy of his eccentric elder brother Sir Thomas Robinson, 1st Baronet.

== Personal life ==
Lord Rokeby died at Thornby, near Leyburn, York in May 1829, aged 71. He was unmarried, but had one illegitimate son, so was, therefore, succeeded in the barony by his younger brother, Matthew, an admirer of Pitt, who had adopted the surname of Montagu.

Parliament of Great Britain
Preceded by Sir Richard Sutton, Bt; The Viscount Palmerston	Member of Parliament for Boroughbridge; 1790–1796; With: Sir Richard Sutton, Bt	Succeeded by Francis Burdett; Sir John Scott
Baronetage of England
Preceded by Matthew Robinson	Baronet (of Rokeby Park); 1800–1829	Succeeded by Matthew Montagu
Peerage of Ireland
Preceded by Matthew Robinson	Baron Rokeby; 1800–1829	Succeeded by Matthew Montagu
