= Baron Rokeby =

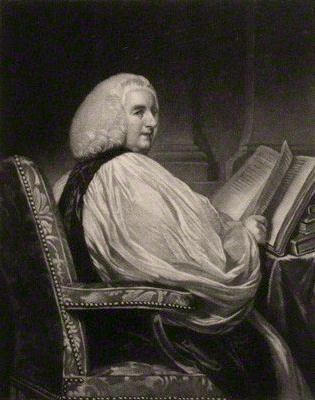
The 1st Baron Rokeby, Lord Primate of All Ireland and Lord Archbishop of Armagh.

Baron Rokeby, of Armagh in the County of Armagh, was a title in the Peerage of Ireland. It was created in 1777 for The Most Rev. Dr Richard Robinson, Church of Ireland Lord Primate of All Ireland and Lord Archbishop of Armagh, with remainder to his brothers and his father's second cousin Matthew Robinson and the heirs male of their bodies. In 1785 he also succeeded his elder brother as 3rd Baronet according to a special remainder (see below). Lord Rokeby never married and was succeeded in the barony and baronetcy according to the special remainders in the letters patent by his third cousin Matthew Robinson-Morris, the second Baron and fourth Baronet. He was the son of Matthew Robinson (by his wife Elizabeth, daughter of Thomas Drake and his wife Sarah, daughter of Thomas Morris, of Mount Morris), son of Thomas Robinson, son of Sir Leonard Robinson, brother of William Robinson, great-grandfather of the first Robinson Baronet (see below) and the first Baron Rokeby. The second Baron was an academic, politician and eccentric. Born Matthew Robinson, he assumed by Royal licence the additional surname of Morris in 1746 on succeeding to the Mount Morris Estate in Monks Horton, Kent through his mother. He never married and was succeeded by his nephew Morris Robinson, the third Baron. He was the elder son of Morris Robinson.

The third Baron sat as Member of Parliament for Boroughbridge. He never married and on his death, the titles passed to his younger brother Matthew Montagu, the fourth Baron. Born Matthew Robinson, he assumed the surname of Montagu in lieu of his patronymic in 1776 on succeeding to the estates of his uncle Edward Montagu. The 4th Lord Rokeby represented several constituencies in Parliament. His younger son, Henry, the sixth Baron (who succeeded his elder brother), was a general in the British Army. The 6th Lord Rokeby had no surviving male issue and on his death in 1883 the barony and baronetcy became extinct.

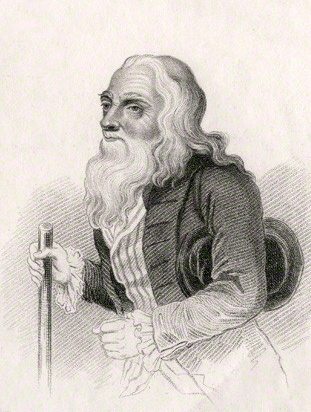
The 2nd Baron Rokeby.

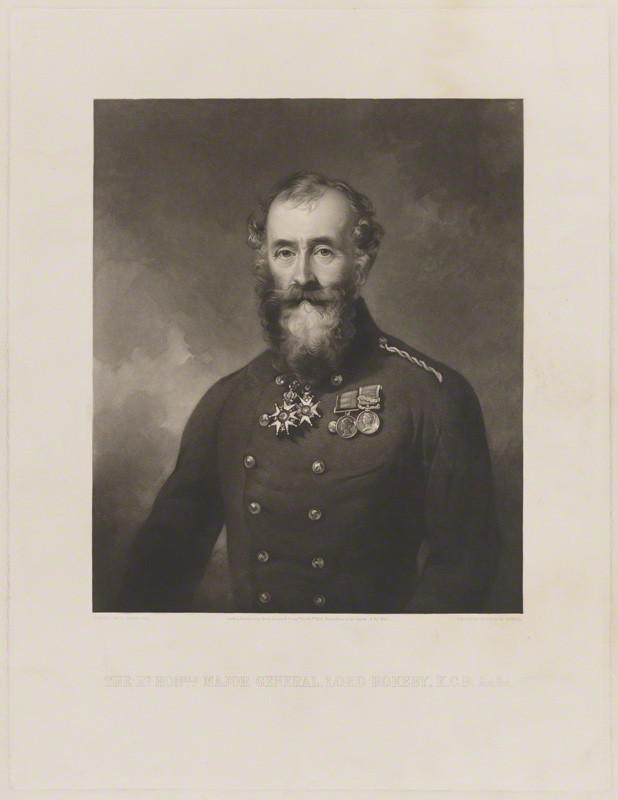
Mezzotint of the 6th and last Lord Rokeby, by George Zobel after Sir Francis Grant, PRA, published by Henry Graves & Co, 1858.

The Baronetcy, of Rokeby Park in the County of York, was created in the Baronetage of Great Britain on 2 March 1730 for the architect, collector and politician Thomas Robinson, with remainder, in default of male issue of his own, to his brothers and to his father’s second cousin Matthew Robinson, and the heirs male of their bodies. He was a descendant of William Robinson who acquired the Rokeby estate in the North Riding of Yorkshire from Sir Thomas Rokeby in 1610. He died childless and was succeeded according to the special remainder by his younger brother, the second Baronet. He was also childless and succeeded by his younger brother, the aforementioned first Baron Rokeby. See above for further history of the baronetcy.

Elizabeth Montagu, sister of the second Baron, was a social reformer, patron of the arts, hostess, literary critic and writer. Sarah Scott, another sister of the second Baron, was a novelist, translator and social reformer.

The title of the barony was pronounced "Rookbie".

== Robinson Baronets, of Rokeby Park (1730) ==
- Sir Thomas Robinson, 1st Baronet (1703–1777)
- Sir William Robinson, 2nd Baronet (1705–1785)
- Sir Richard Robinson, 3rd Baronet (1708–1794) (had been created Baron Rokeby in 1777)
- Matthew Robinson, 2nd Baron Rokeby, (1713–1800), 4th Baronet
- Morris Robinson, 3rd Baron Rokeby (1757–1829), 5th Baronet
- Matthew Montagu, 4th Baron Rokeby (1762–1831), 6th Baronet
- Edward Montagu, 5th Baron Rokeby (1787–1847), 7th Baronet
- Henry Montagu, 6th Baron Rokeby (1798–1883), 8th and last Baronet.

== Robinson baronets, of Rokeby Hall (1819) ==
- Sir John Friend Robinson, 1st Baronet (1754–1832). Born John Friend, he was the son of Grace Robinson and the Very Reverend William Friend, Dean of Canterbury, and nephew and heir of Richard Robinson, 1st Baron Rokeby. He assumed, by sign manual, the surname of Robinson in 1793 and was created a baronet on 14 October 1819.
- Sir Richard Robinson, 2nd Baronet (1787–1847)
- Sir John Stephen Robinson, 3rd Baronet (1816–1895)
- Sir Gerald William Collingwood Robinson, 4th Baronet (1857–1903)
- Sir Richard Harcourt Robinson, 5th Baronet (1828–1910)

== Barons Rokeby (1777) ==
- Richard Robinson, 1st Baron Rokeby (1708–1794)
- Matthew Robinson, 2nd Baron Rokeby (1713–1800)
- Morris Robinson, 3rd Baron Rokeby (1757–1829)
- Matthew Montagu, 4th Baron Rokeby (1762–1831)
- Edward Montagu, 5th Baron Rokeby (1787–1847)
- Henry Montagu, 6th Baron Rokeby (1798–1883)

Baronetage of Great Britain
Preceded by Wyche baronets	Robinson baronets of Rokeby Park; 2 March 1730	Succeeded by Lade baronets
