= James Creed =

British merchant and politician (c. 1695–1762)

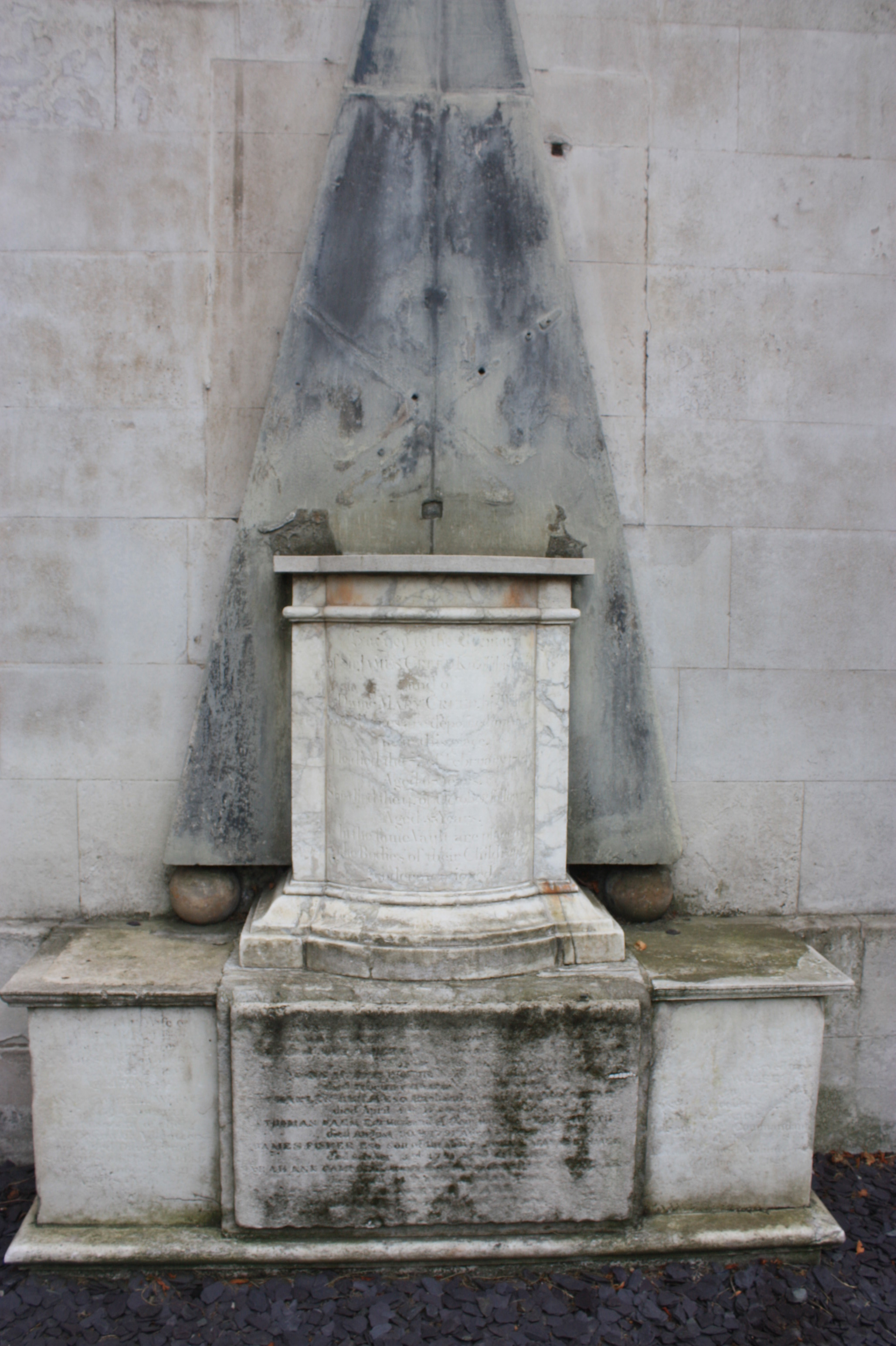
The grave of Sir James Creed, St Alfege Church, Greenwich, London

Sir James Creed (c. 1695 – 7 February 1762) was an English merchant and politician.

Creed was a merchant of London and a director of the Honourable East India Company. He was in business in the manufacture of white lead, for which he obtained a patent in December 1749. He was elected a Fellow of the Royal Society in February, 1743. He was seen as a loyal supporter of the Prime Minister, the Duke of Newcastle.

In 1754 Creed was elected Member of Parliament (MP) for Canterbury where he was seen as a loyal supporter of the Whig Prime Minister, the Duke of Newcastle. He lost the seat to two Tory candidates in 1761.

Creed was buried with his wife Dame Mary Creed at St Alfege Church, Greenwich where there is a marble monument to his memory against the outer north wall.

Parliament of Great Britain
Preceded by Matthew Robinson-Morris; Thomas Best	Member of Parliament for Canterbury; 1754–1761; With: Matthew Robinson-Morris	Succeeded by Richard Milles; Thomas Best
