= Robert Ellison (British Army officer) =

- Died: 3 June 1843 (aged 52–53); Hyde Park
- Military career
- Allegiance: United Kingdom
- Branch: British Army
- Service years: 1807–1843
- Rank: Colonel
- Nickname: Black Bob
- Unit: 1st Regiment of Foot Guards
- Conflicts: Napoleonic Wars; Peninsular War; Battle of Quatre Bras; Battle of Waterloo

Colonel Robert Ellison (1790 – 3 July 1843) was a British Army officer who fought in the Peninsular War and at the 1815 Battle of Waterloo.

== Life ==
The second son of Henry Ellison, of Hebburn, County Durham, and Henrietta, daughter of John Isaacson, he joined the 1st Regiment of Foot Guards as an ensign by purchase on 17 December 1807. He became a lieutenant and captain on 20 December 1812 then saw service at Cádiz, Spain in 1811 and during the Peninsular War from 1812 to 1814. During the Waterloo Campaign he fought at Quatre Bras and Waterloo, for which he was promoted Brevet Major. At the latter battle he fought with the light companies at Hougoumont where "on one occasion, when he was forced to retreat from the orchard to the chateau, he would have been bayoneted by the French, had not the men, with whom he was a great favourite, charged back, and saved his life.

After Waterloo he was at the taking of Péronne on 26 June 1815. Subsequently, he became a lieutenant-colonel on 15 April 1824 and a major and colonel on 9 January 1838

Ellison's profuse growth of dark facial hair earned him the regimental sobriquet "Black Bob".

== Family ==
On 24 May 1820, Ellison married the Honourable Mary Montague, sister of Lord Rokeby. His brother-in-law was Henry Goulburn, who in 1828 became Chancellor of the Exchequer. The names of the couple's children are unknown.

Ellison's brother Cuthbert (1783–1860) was Member of Parliament (MP) for Newcastle upon Tyne and was represented by Robert at the Newcastle upon Tyne Parliamentary election, 1820.

== Death ==
At quarter to nine on the morning of 3 June 1843, Ellison as Colonel of the Grenadier Guards, was on field duty in Hyde Park where a band was playing and the regimental colours flying. No sooner had he given the order to "present arms" when he had some sort of fit and fell from his horse. Despite the efforts of a surgeon present, twenty minutes later Ellison was dead and his body conveyed to his house in Norfolk Street, Park Lane. At the subsequent coroner's inquest, a doctor testified that although Eliison had "an organic disease of the heart" he believed "that the brain was more involved in the cause of death than the heart"; as a result the jury recorded a verdict of "Died by the visitation of God."
