= Richard Milles =

English politician, landowner and horticulturalist

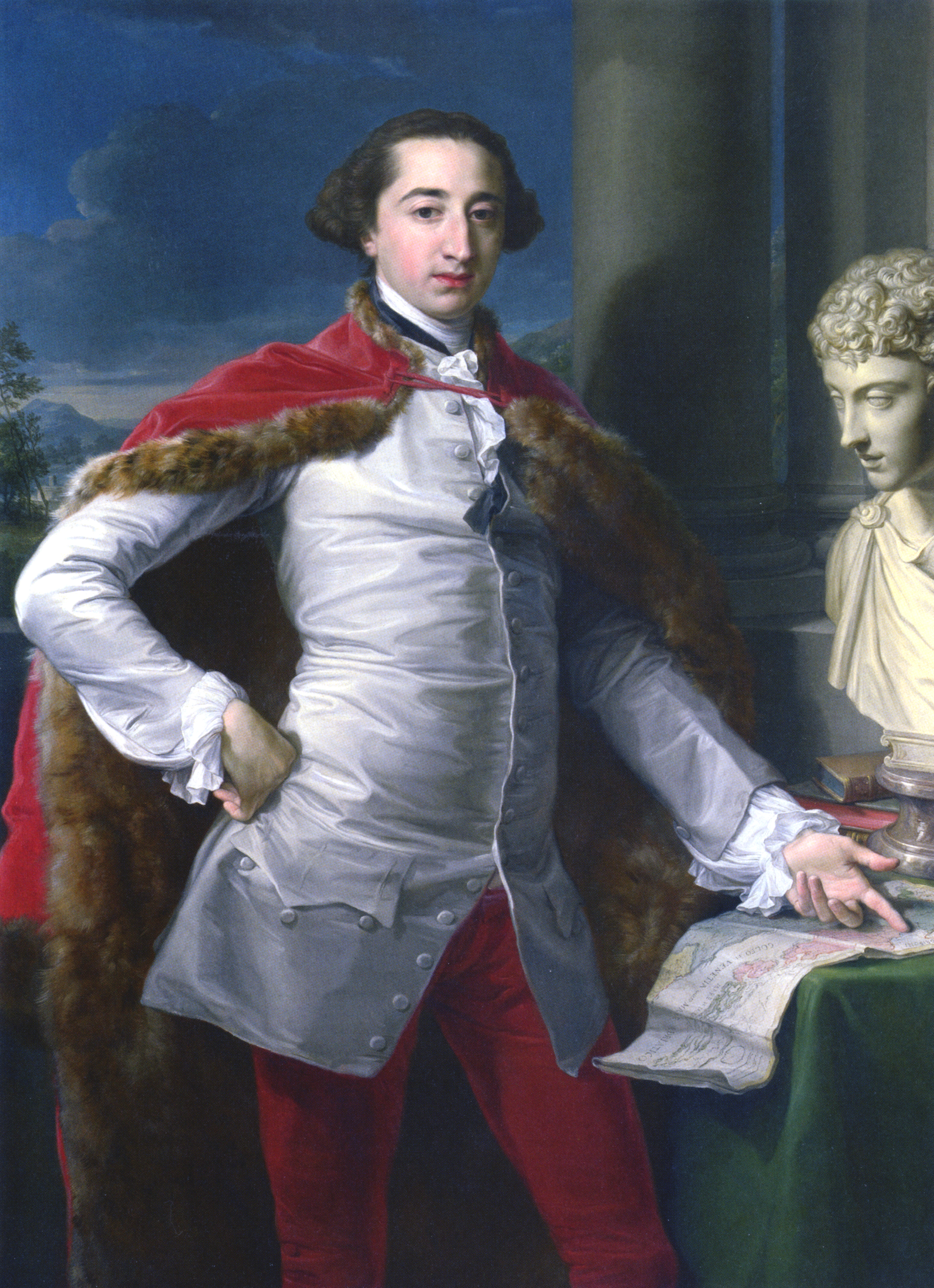
Portrait of Richard Milles by Pompeo Batoni

Richard Milles (c. 1735 – 14 September 1820) was an English Tory politician, landowner and horticulturalist who sat in the British House of Commons from 1761 to 1780, representing the constituency of Canterbury.

== Early life ==
Milles was the son of Christopher Milles of Nackington, and his wife Mary Warner, daughter of Richard Warner of North Elmham Norfolk. He was educated at Westminster School and at St John's College, Cambridge. He entered Lincoln's Inn in 1753. He was a country gentleman with large estates. Before 1761, he went on the Grand Tour of Europe.

== Career ==
He was noted as a botanist and planted an orchard at his garden at North Elmham.

Milles was elected Member of Parliament (MP) for Canterbury in 1761 and won that and two subsequent election by a comfortable majority, holding the seat to 1780, when he did not stand.

== Personal life ==
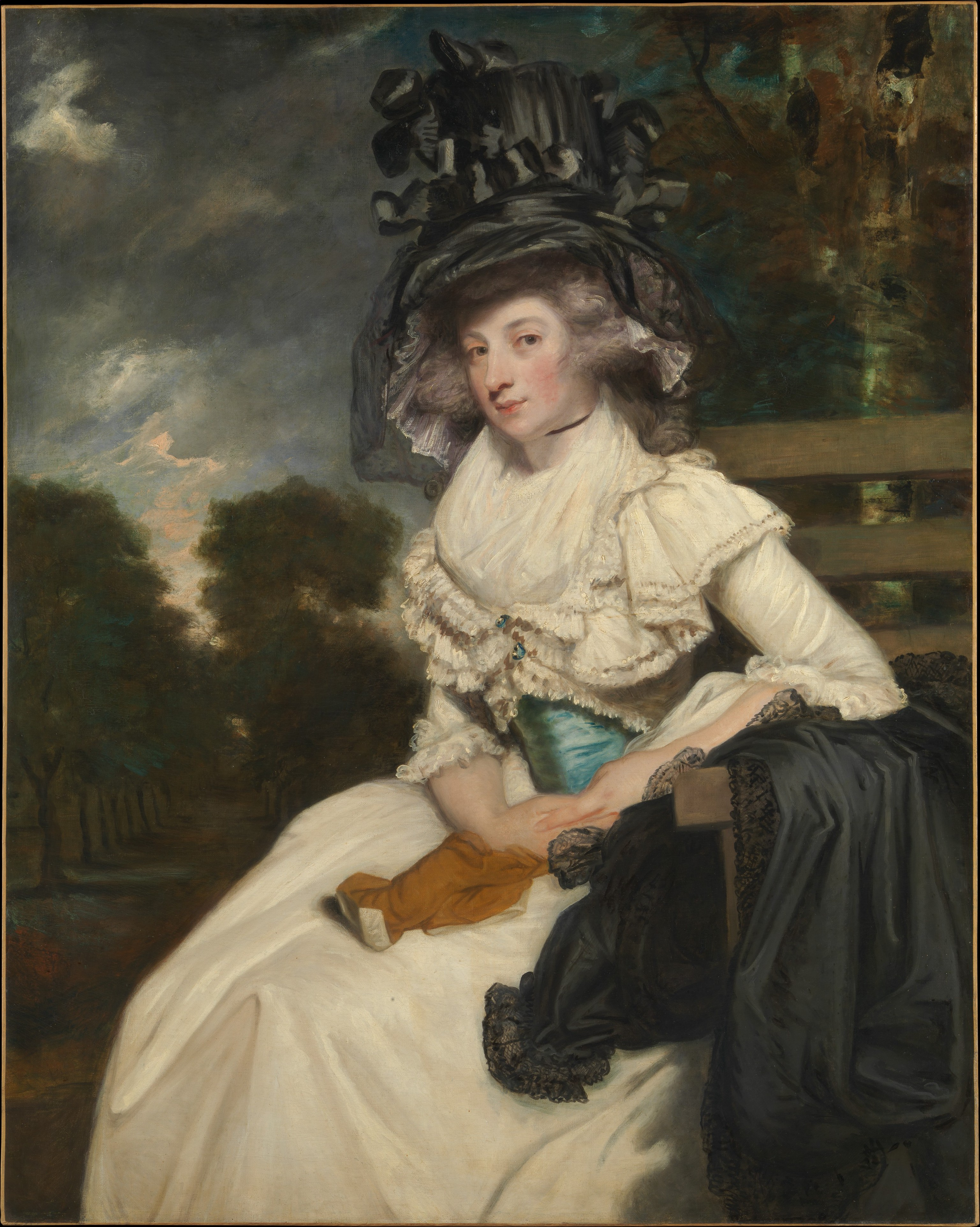
Portrait of his daughter, Mary Elizabeth Milles, by Sir Joshua Reynolds, 1789, at the Metropolitan Museum of Art

Milles married on 9 October 1765, Mary Elizabeth Tanner, daughter of the Rev. Thomas Tanner, DD, Prebendary of Canterbury. Together, they had their only daughter in 1767

- Mary Elizabeth Milles (1767–1818), later Lady Sondes married Hon. Lewis Thomas Watson, son of Lewis Watson, 1st Baron Sondes in 1785. Hon. Lewis Thomas Watson was descended collaterally from the Earls of Rockingham, and his mother had been a granddaughter of John Manners, 2nd Duke of Rutland, and a daughter of Henry Pelham, a former prime minister. The first of the couple's four sons was born in 1792, and in 1795, Lewis Watson succeeded his father as second Baron Sondes of Lees Court and of Rockingham Castle, Northamptonshire. He died in 1806. Three years later, Lady Sondes married Brigadier General Sir Henry Tucker Montresor. She died in Kent in 1818. Her portrait was painted by both Joshua Reynolds and Thomas Gainsborough.

Parliament of Great Britain
Preceded by Matthew Robinson-Morrison; James Creed	Member of Parliament for Canterbury; 1761–1780; With: Thomas Best 1761–1768; William Lynch 1768–1774; Sir William Mayne, Bt 1774–1780	Succeeded by George Gipps; Charles Robinson
