= Spencer Montagu =

English cricketer

Personal information
- Full name: Spencer Dudley Montagu
- Born: 1807; Marylebone, Middlesex, England
- Died: 31 March 1882 (aged 74/75); Hare Hatch, Berkshire, England
- Batting: Unknown

Domestic team information
- Years: Team
- 1835: Marylebone Cricket Club

Career statistics
Competition	First-class
Matches	2
Runs scored	0
Batting average	0.00
100s/50s	–/–
Top score	0*
Catches/stumpings	2/–
- Source: Cricinfo, 2 August 2019

Spencer Dudley Montagu (1807 – 31 March 1882) was an English first-class cricketer.

The son of Matthew Montagu, 4th Baron Rokeby and his wife, Elizabeth Charlton, he was born at Marylebone in 1807. He was educated at Harrow School. Montagu later made two appearances in first-class cricket. His first appearance came for the Gentlemen of England against the Gentlemen of Kent at Chislehurst in 1832, with his second appearance coming for the Marylebone Cricket Club against Oxford University at Oxford in 1835. Away from cricket, he served as a civil servant at the Irish Office in Whitehall. Montagu was married twice during his life, firstly to Anna Louisa Flint from 1842 until their divorce prior to 1868, and secondly to Henrietta Elizabeth Harriet Pemberton, with both of his marriages yielding one child each. He died in March 1882 at Hare Hatch at Wargrave in Berkshire.
