= Sir Richard Sutton, 1st Baronet =

British politician

Sir Richard Sutton Bt, MP

Under Secretary of State for the Southern Department
- In office July 1766 – October 1768; December 1770 – October 1772

Under Secretary of State for the Northern Department
- In office October 1768 – December 1770

Lord of the Treasury
- In office September 1780 – March 1782

Member of Parliament for St Albans
- In office 1768–1780

Member of Parliament for Sandwich
- In office 1780–1784

Member of Parliament for Boroughbridge
- In office 1784–1796

Personal details
- Born: 31 July 1733
- Died: 10 January 1802 (aged 68) Bath, Somerset
- Spouses: Susanna de Crespigny (m. 1765–1766) Anne Williams (m. 1770–1787) Anne Porter (m. 1793)
- Education: Westminster School
- Alma mater: Trinity College, Cambridge
- Profession: Lawyer and politician

Sir Richard Sutton, 1st Baronet MP (31 July 1733 – 10 January 1802), of Norwood Park in Nottinghamshire, was a British politician who sat in the House of Commons from 1768 to 1796.

== Family background and education ==
Sutton was the younger son of the Right Honourable Sir Robert Sutton, KB, MP, politician and diplomat, and Judith Tichborne, previously the third wife and widow of Charles Spencer, 3rd Earl of Sunderland. She was the daughter of Sir Benjamin Tichborne of Beaulieu and niece of Henry Tichborne, 1st Baron Ferrard. He was a great-grandson of Henry Sutton, younger brother of Robert Sutton, 1st Baron Lexinton (which peerage became extinct in 1723). The Sutton baronets were thus distantly related (Note: The 2nd Baron was nephew of Henry Sutton; his daughter the Duchess of Rutland was great-niece of Henry Sutton, and his grandson the Marquess of Granby (1721–1770) was thus a third cousin of Sir Richard Sutton).) to the dukes of Rutland, who were descended from the marriage of the 3rd Duke to the Honourable Bridget Sutton, heiress of Robert Sutton, 2nd Baron Lexinton.

Sutton was educated at Westminster School and Trinity College, Cambridge, and trained as a lawyer, being admitted to the Middle Temple in 1754, then admitted to the Inner Temple and called to the bar in 1759. He was appointed Recorder of St Albans on 24 November 1763 by John Spencer, 1st Earl Spencer. (Note: Lord Spencer was a grandson of the 3rd Earl of Sunderland by a child of his second wife, while Sutton was a son of the Earl's third wife and widow.)

== Political career ==
In July 1766 Sutton was selected by William Petty, 2nd Earl of Shelburne, the Southern Secretary, to serve as an Under-Secretary of State in his department. He then served under William Nassau de Zuylestein, 4th Earl of Rochford, the Northern Secretary, from October 1768 to December 1770, before following him back to the Southern department.

Sutton first entered parliament in 1768 as Member of Parliament for St Albans, again appointed by Lord Spencer. He spoke regularly on behalf of his department, but also on social and economic matters. Sutton also showed an occasional independent streak, by voting against the Government, most notably on the Royal Marriages Act. On 1 October 1772 Sutton resigned from his position in the Southern Department, having inherited the house and estate of Norwood Park, and an income of around £4,000 a year (equivalent to about £528,000 today), following the death of his older brother. Two weeks later, in recognition of his services, he was created a baronet, and also received a pension of £500 annually for life.

He remained an MP on the Government benches, being a staunch defender of their American policy, even donating £500 to help raise a volunteer company for service in the American War in 1779. Later that year Sutton was selected by the Prime Minister Lord North to be one of the Lords of the Treasury. Since Sutton's original sponsor Lord Spencer was now with the Opposition, in the 1780 election Sutton was selected for two seats; Sandwich and Aldborough. He chose to represent Sandwich, and after a by-election Edward Onslow sat for Aldborough.

He remained a supporter and defender of Lord North, even after he was forced out of office in March 1782. In the 1784 election, Sutton was selected by Henry Pelham-Clinton, 2nd Duke of Newcastle as one of the MPs for Boroughbridge, as a supporter of the government of Pitt. He was returned for the constituency in the 1790 election, but retired in 1796.

Sutton died in Bath, Somerset, on 10 January 1802. As his eldest son John had died in 1801, the baronetcy was inherited by his 4-year-old grandson Richard.

== Personal life ==
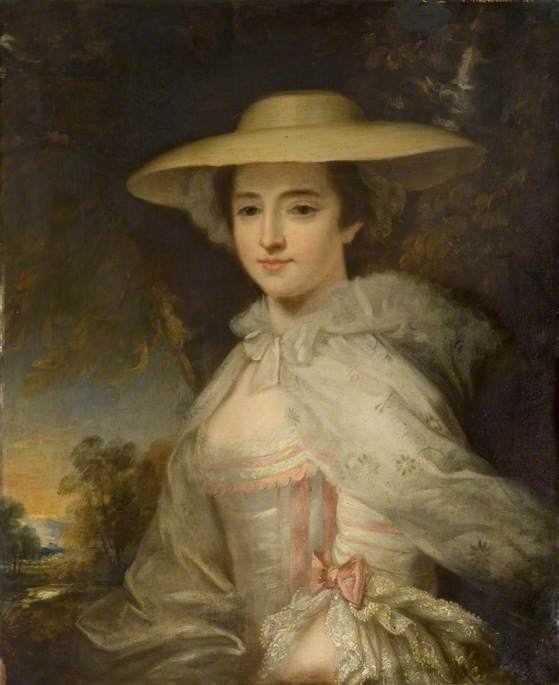
Portrait of his first wife, Susan Champion de Crespigny, by George Romney (circle of)

Sutton was married three times. His first wife Susanna Champion de Crespigny, daughter of Philip Champion de Crespigny, died on 12 June 1766, after barely a year of marriage. On 7 February 1770, he married Anne Williams, by whom he had seven children. She died in December 1787, and on 8 April 1793 he married Anne Porter, (Note: Named as "Margaret Porter" in Debrett's.) who survived him.

His children were:

1. Elizabeth Evelyn, who married George Markham, son of William Markham, Archbishop of York, and later John Pulteney.
2. John, who married Sophia Frances Chaplin, and had two children, Richard, who inherited the baronetcy aged 4, and Sophia Charlotte, who died young.
3. Richard, Rector of Brant Broughton.
4. Anne Georgiana, who married The Reverend Robert Chaplin.
5. Isabella Frances, who married The Reverend William Chaplin.
6. Robert Nassau, who in 1812 married Mary Georgiana, the daughter of John Manners Sutton.
7. Henry, died young.

== Notes ==
Parliament of Great Britain
| Preceded by James West; Viscount Nuneham | Member of Parliament for St Albans; 1768–1780; With: John Radcliffe | Succeeded by William Charles Sloper; John Radcliffe |
| Preceded by William Baker; Hon. William Hanger | Member of Parliament for Aldborough; September 1780 – November 1780; With: Charles Mellish | Succeeded by Edward Onslow; Charles Mellish |
| Preceded by Philip Stephens; Charles Brett | Member of Parliament for Sandwich; 1780–1784; With: Philip Stephens | Succeeded by Philip Stephens; Charles Brett |
| Preceded by Anthony Eyre; Charles Ambler | Member of Parliament for Boroughbridge; 1784–1796; With: The Viscount Palmerston 1784–90; Morris Robinson 1790–96 | Succeeded by Francis Burdett; Sir John Scott |
Baronetage of Great Britain
| New creation | Baronet (of Norwood Park); 1772–1802 | Succeeded by Richard Sutton |
