= George Jones (bishop) =

English Anglican priest

George Lewis Jones (6 Sep 1725 – 9 March 1804), was an English Anglican priest, Bishop of Kilmore from 1775 to 1790 when he was translated to Kildare.

Born 6 September and baptised at St Giles, Cripplegate in London on 12 September 1725, he was the son of Theophilus Jones. He was educated at Eton College and matriculated at King's College, Cambridge in 1742. He was ordained in 1747, and held livings in Wiltshire, Surrey and Norfolk. He became chaplain to Simon Harcourt, 1st Earl Harcourt, Lord Lieutenant of Ireland.

He died on 9 March 1804.

Church of Ireland titles
Preceded by Denison Cumberland	Bishop of Kilmore; 1775–1790	Succeeded by William Foster
Preceded by Charles Jackson	Bishop of Kildare; 1790–1804	Succeeded by Charles Dalrymple Lyndsay
