= William Newcome =

18th-century Anglican Irish bishop

The Most Reverend and Right Honourable William Newcome PC (Ire), D.D.
- Archbishop of Armagh; Primate of All Ireland
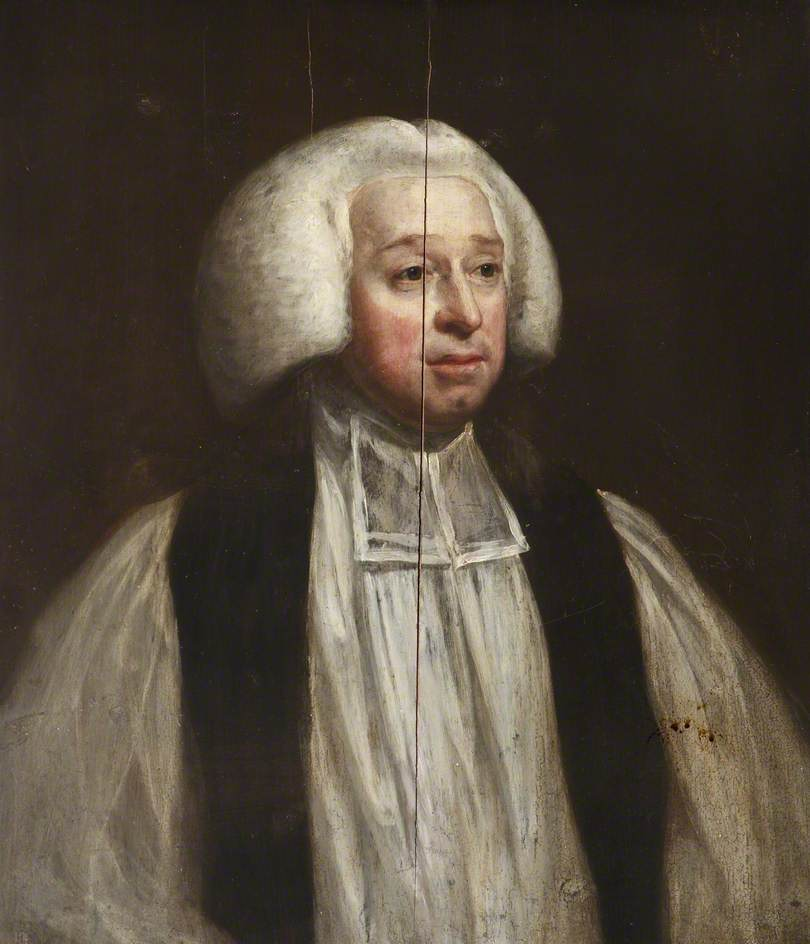
- Church: Church of Ireland
- See: Armagh
- Appointed: 27 January 1795
- In office: 1795-1800
- Predecessor: Richard Robinson
- Successor: William Stuart
- Previous posts: Bishop of Dromore (1766–1775); Bishop of Ossory (1775–1779); Bishop of Waterford and Lismore (1779–1795)

Orders
- Consecration: 27 April 1766 by Richard Robinson

Personal details
- Born: 10 April 1729 Abingdon-on-Thames, Berkshire, England
- Died: 11 January 1800 (aged 70) St Stephen's Green, Dublin, Ireland
- Buried: Trinity College, Dublin
- Denomination: Anglican
- Education: Abingdon School
- Alma mater: Pembroke College, Oxford; Hertford College, Oxford

William Newcome (10 April 1729 – 11 January 1800) was an Englishman and cleric of the Church of Ireland who was appointed to the bishoprics of Dromore (1766–1775), Ossory (1775–1779), Waterford and Lismore (1779–1795), and lastly to the Primatial See of Armagh (1795–1800).

== Early life ==
Newcome was born at Abingdon, Berkshire, on 10 April 1729. He was the second son of Joseph Newcome, vicar of St Helen's Church, Abingdon, rector of Barton-in-the-Clay, Bedfordshire, and grand-nephew of Henry Newcome.

He was educated at John Roysse's Free School in Abingdon (now Abingdon School), obtained (1745) a scholarship at Pembroke College, Oxford, migrated to Hertford College, Oxford, and graduated M.A. 1753, and D.D. 1765. He was elected a Fellow of Hertford College in 1753, and afterwards Vice-Principal of Hertford College.

== Career ==
In 1766, Newcome went to Ireland as chaplain to Francis Seymour-Conway, 1st Marquess of Hertford, who was appointed Lord Lieutenant of Ireland. Before the end of the year, Newcome was promoted to the see of Dromore, which had become vacant in April. He was translated to Ossory in 1775; to Waterford and Lismore in 1779; finally, he was made Archbishop of Armagh and primate of all Ireland on 25 January 1795, during the short-lived viceroyalty of William Fitzwilliam, 4th Earl Fitzwilliam.

Newcome's elevation to the primacy was said to be the express act of George III. He had no English patron but Fox, who was not then in power. His appointment was described by James Caulfeild, 1st Earl of Charlemont as the reward of character, principles, and erudition. His private fortune was large; he was able to advance without difficulty a sum of between fifteen and sixteen thousand pounds, assigned by parliament to the heirs of his predecessor, Richard Robinson, 1st Baron Rokeby. In his primary visitation of the province (1795), he strongly urged the neglected duty of clerical residence. He spent large sums on the improvement of the cathedral and palace at Armagh.

=== Works ===
Newcome had influence through his work An attempt toward revising our English translation of the Greek Scriptures, and toward illustrating the sense by philological and explanatory notes (1796) (commonly known as Archbishop Newcome's new translation). This is to be distinguished from the revised version of Thomas Belsham published by Unitarians after his death: The New Testament in an Improved Version Upon the Basis of Archbishop Newcome's New Translation (1808), which, among other changes, did not include the Comma Johanneum. Newcome worked on a revision of the whole English Bible, of which An Attempt was the New Testament portion. The work was withheld from publication until 1800, after Newcome's death; as the impression was damaged in crossing from Dublin, the number of copies for sale was small. In 1808 Unitarians issued anonymously their Improved Version. The adaptations for a sectarian purpose were mainly the work of Belsham, to whom an indignant reply was addressed (7 August 1809) by Newcome's brother-in-law, Joseph Stock, D.D., Bishop of Killala and Achonry.

Newcome's first major publication was 'An Harmony of the Gospels,’ &c., Dublin, 1778, on the basis of Jean Le Clerc, the Greek text being given with various readings from Wetstein. In this work he criticised Joseph Priestley's adoption (1777) of the hypothesis (1733) of Nicholas Mann, limiting Christ's ministry to a single year. Priestley defended himself in his English 'Harmony' (1780), and Newcome replied in a small volume, 'The Duration of our Lord's Ministry,’ &c., Dublin, 1780. The controversy was continued in two pamphlets by Priestley and one by Newcome, 'A Reply,’ &c., Dublin, 1781; it closed with a private letter from Newcome to Priestley (19 April 1782). While he held his ground against Priestley, on another point Newcome subsequently revised his 'Harmony' in 'A Review of the Chief Difficulties ... relating to our Lord's Resurrection,’ &c., 1792; in this, he recurs to the hypothesis of George Benson. An English 'Harmony,’ on the basis of Newcome's Greek one, was published in 1802; reprinted in 1827.

As an interpreter of the prophets, Newcome followed Robert Lowth. His 'Attempt towards an Improved Version, a Metrical Arrangement, and an Explanation of the Twelve Minor Prophets,’ &c., 1785 was reissued, with additions from Samuel Horsley and Benjamin Blayney, Pontefract, 1809. In his version, he claims to give 'the critical sense ... and not the opinions of any denomination.' In his notes, he makes frequent use of the manuscripts of Thomas Secker. It was followed by 'An Attempt towards an Improved Version ... of ... Ezekiel,’ &c., Dublin, 1788 (reprinted 1836). These were parts of a larger plan, set forth in 'An Historical View of the English Biblical Translations,’ &c., 1792, with suggestions for a revision by authority.

In addition to the above Newcome published three single sermons (1767–72) and a charge (1795); also 'Observations on our Lord's Conduct as a Divine Instructor,’ &c. 1782; 2nd ed. revised, 1795; 3rd ed. 1820; also Oxford, 1852. Some of his letters to Joshua Toulmin, D.D., are in the Monthly Repository, 1806, pp. 458 sq., 518 sq.

== Personal life ==
Newcome was twice married, by his first wife Anna Maria Smyth, he produced one daughter, Isabella, wife of Anthony Chearnley. By his second wife, Susannah D'Oyley he had a numerous family, including Alicia, wife of Reverend Thomas Blakeney and Frances, wife of Sir Richard Musgrave, 3rd Baronet of Tourin.

Newcome died at his residence, St Stephen's Green, Dublin, on 11 January 1800, and was buried in the chapel of Trinity College, Dublin.

== See also ==
- List of Old Abingdonians

Religious titles
Preceded by Henry Maxwell	Bishop of Dromore; 1766–1775	Succeeded by James Hawkins
Preceded by Charles Dodgson	Bishop of Ossory; 1775–1779	Succeeded by John Hotham
Preceded by Richard Chenevix	Bishop of Waterford and Lismore; 1779–1795	Succeeded by Richard Marlay
Preceded by The Lord Rokeby	Archbishop of Armagh; 1795–1800	Succeeded by William Stuart
