= Sir Thomas Robinson, 1st Baronet =

Sir Thomas Robinson Bt
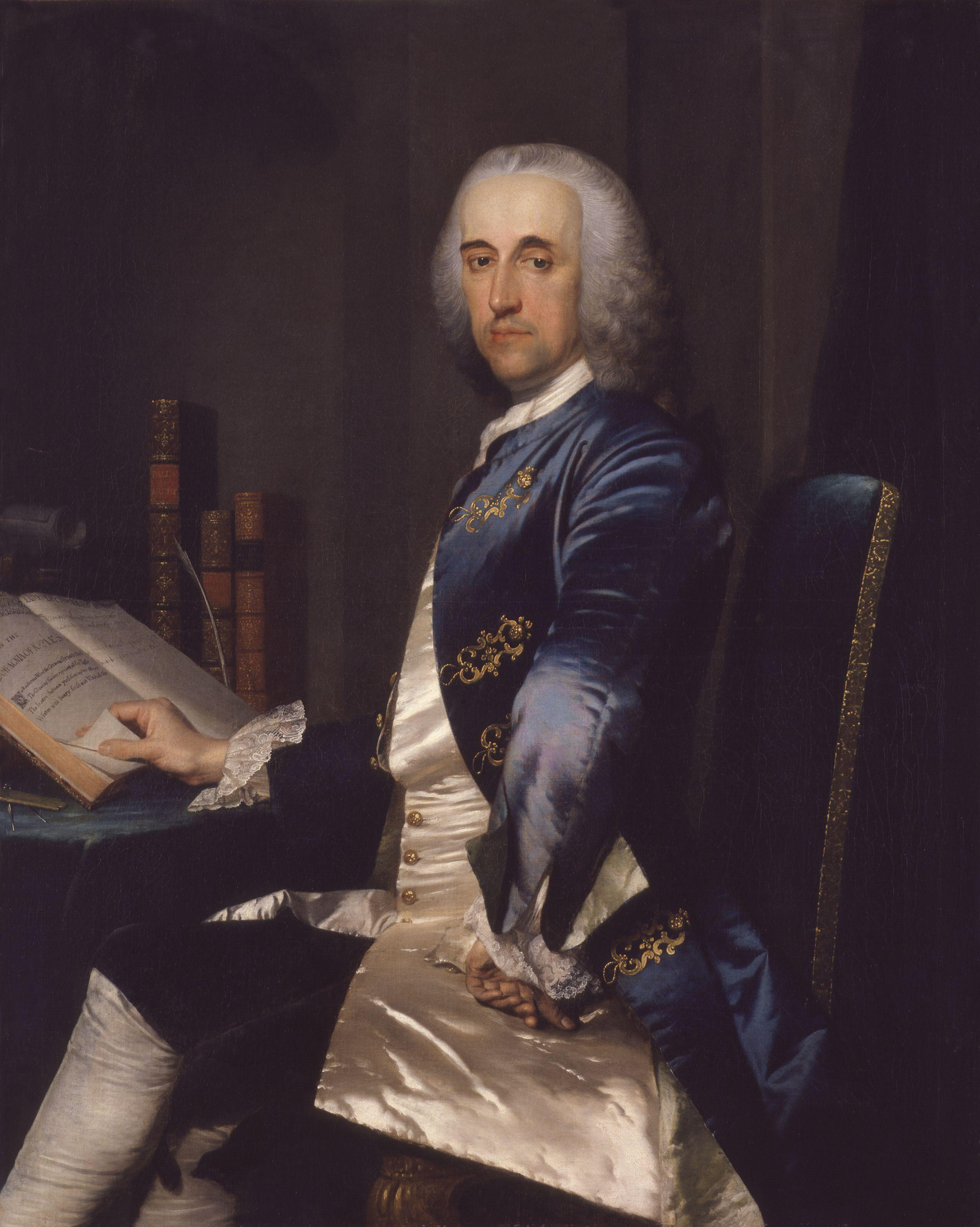
- Portrait by Frans van der Mijn, c. 1750

Governor of Barbados
- In office 1742–1747
- Monarch: George II
- Preceded by: James Dotin (acting)
- Succeeded by: Henry Grenville

Personal details
- Born: 1703 Rokeby Park, Yorkshire
- Died: 3 March 1777 (aged 73–74) Chelsea, London
- Party: Whig
- Spouse: Lady Elizabeth Howard

Sir Thomas Robinson, 1st Baronet (1703 – 3 March 1777) was a British Whig politician and colonial administrator who represented Morpeth in the House of Commons of Great Britain from 1727 to 1734. Along with serving as the governor of Barbados from 1742 to 1747, in his private life Robinson dabbled in architecture and art collecting. An extravagant character, his life was the inspiration for numerous anecdotes.

== Early life ==
Robinson was eldest son and heir of William Robinson (bapt. Rokeby, Yorkshire, 23 September 1675, d. 24 February 1720), who married, in 1699, Anne, daughter and heiress of Robert Walters of Cundall in Yorkshire; she died on 26 July 1730, aged 53, and was buried in the centre of the south aisle of Merton church, Surrey, where a marble monument was placed to her memory. Sir Thomas, her son, also erected on the old Roman highway, near Rokeby, an obelisk in her honour. Another son was Richard, 1st Baron Rokeby, Church of Ireland Primate of All Ireland and Archbishop of Armagh.

After finishing his education, Robinson went on the Grand Tour, paying attention to architecture in Greece and Italy, and the school of Palladio. On returning to England he purchased a commission in the army, but resigned it in favour of his brother Septimus.

== Politics and architecture ==
At the 1727 British general election Robinson was returned as Member of Parliament for Morpeth, through the influence of George Bowes. He was a supporter of the Whig government of Robert Walpole. Seeing no prospect of being returned at Morpeth at the 1734 British general election, he sought a seat in Cornwall, but without success. He made some long speeches in Parliament. They included one which, according to Horace Walpole, he was supposed to have found among the papers of his wife's first husband.

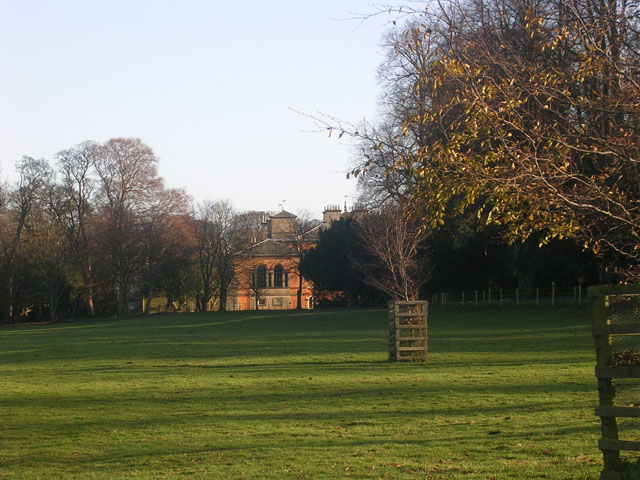
Rokeby Hall

Robinson was created a baronet on 10 March 1731, with remainder to his brothers and to Matthew Robinson, and from November 1735 to February 1742 he was a commissioner of excise. He became a Fellow of the Society of Antiquaries of London in 1735.

Robinson's expenditure was extravagant. He rebuilt Rokeby Hall at Rokeby Park, the name of which he changed from Rookby. He enclosed the park with a stone wall (1725–30), and planted many forest trees (1730). These acts were recorded in 1737, in two Latin inscriptions on two marble tables, fixed in the two stone piers at the entrance to the park from Greta Bridge. He practically made the place of which Sir Walter Scott wrote in his poem Rokeby, and built the great bridge which spans the River Tees there.

In London, Robinson threw balls aimed at the people in power and in fashion; and ruined himself. Horace Walpole gave an account of his ball for a daughter of the Duke of Richmond in October 1741. There were two hundred guests invited. A second ball was given by him on 2 December 1741, when six hundred persons were invited and two hundred attended.

== In Barbados ==
The state of Robinson's finances brought about his expatriation. Lord Lincoln coveted his house at Whitehall, and secured for him in January 1742 the post of governor of Barbados. It is not certain whether the Duke coveted the house or the socialite the Lady Townshend who rented one half it.

Arriving in Barbados on 8 August 1742, Robinson had trouble with his assembly, which raised difficulties about voting for his salary. Without consulting the house, he ordered changes in his residence at Pilgrim, and he undertook the construction of an armoury and arsenal. He had to pay most of the charges out of his own pocket.

Another quarrel was over the command of the forces on the island. Eventually, a petition was sent home which resulted in Robinson's recall on 14 April 1747.

== Later life ==
On his return to the Kingdom of Great Britain, Robinson again gave balls and breakfasts, and among the breakfasts was one to the Princess of Wales. In a note to William Mason's Epistle to Shebbeare, he is dubbed "the Petronius of the present age", referencing the Satyricon. He became a member of the Royal Society of Arts in 1755, and was active there in recruitment and administration.

Robinson acquired shares in Ranelagh Gardens, and became the director of the entertainments; his knowledge of the fashionable world then proved of use. He built for himself a house called Prospect Place, adjoining the gardens, and gave magnificent feasts. At the coronation of George III, on 22 September 1761, the last occasion on which the dukes of Normandy and Aquitaine were represented by deputies as doing homage to the king of England, Robinson acted as Normandy, walking "in proper mantle" next to the Archbishop of Canterbury.

Robinson was forced in 1769 to dispose of Rokeby Park, which had been in the possession of his family since 1610, to John Sawrey Morritt, the father of John Bacon Sawrey Morritt. Anna Eliza Bray wrote of his fondness for "books, the fine arts, music, and refined society", and mentions the weakness of his eyes. At last, he became blind, and her father used to read to him.

== Death and reputation ==
Robinson died at his house at Chelsea on 3 March 1777, aged 76, without leaving legitimate issue, and was buried in the southeast corner of the chancel of Merton church, a monument being placed there to his memory. A second monument was erected for him in Westminster Abbey, about 1778, with two portrait busts by John Walsh, commemorating also his first wife.

Robinson's reputation was as a "specious, empty man", with a talent for flattery. He was tall and thin, while his contemporary of the same name Thomas Robinson, 1st Baron Grantham was short and fat. "I can't imagine", said the witty Lady Townshend, "why one is preferred to the other. The one is as broad as the other is long".

== Legacy ==
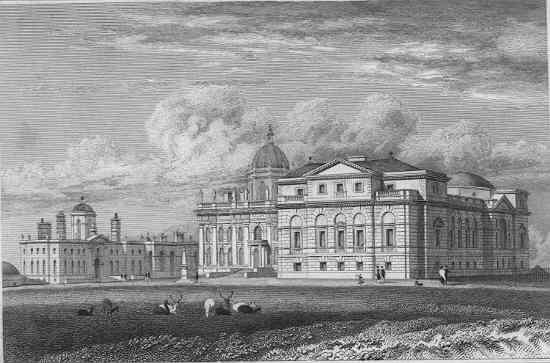
Castle Howard, 19th-century engraving, view from the north-west with the Palladian west wing prominent

Robinson designed, for his wife's brother, the west wing of Castle Howard. Later in life he and Welbore Ellis persuaded Sir William Stanhope to "improve" Alexander Pope's garden.

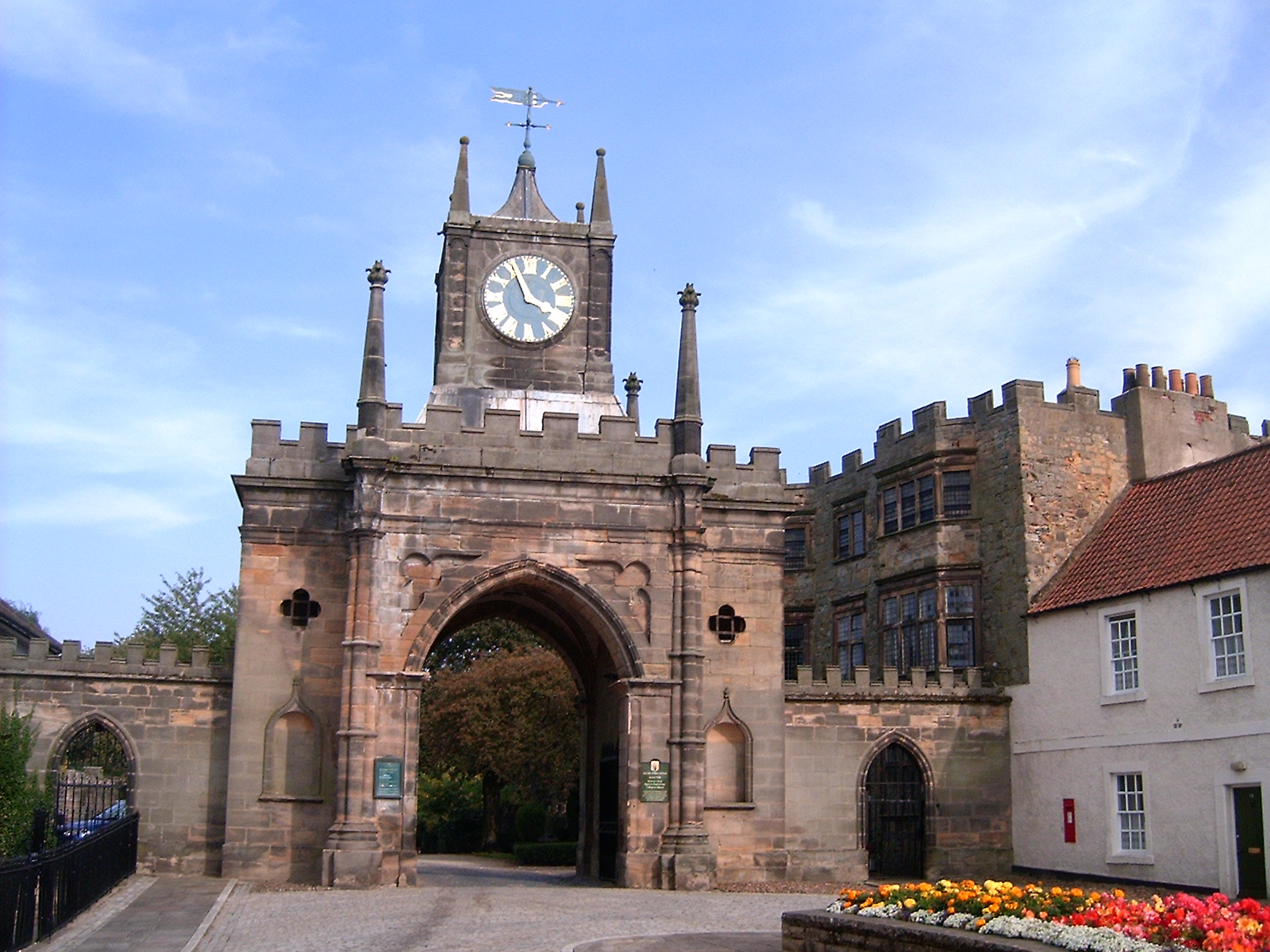
Gateway at Auckland Castle, design of Thomas Robinson for Richard Trevor

Among Robinson's other works are parts of Ember Court, Surrey, then the residence of the Onslows, the new parish church at Glynde in Sussex, and the Gothic gateway at Bishop Auckland in Durham. He worked also on Claydon House for The 2nd Earl of Verney, a business associate through Ranelagh Gardens.

Robinson left his brother William his title but not his estates. His other brother, Archbishop Lord Rokeby, had his books, including those on architecture and antiquities.

Robinson and Lord Chesterfield maintained a correspondence for fifty years, and he kept all the letters and copies. At his death he left them to an apothecary who had married his natural daughter, with instructions to publish; but Robinson's brother, Archbishop Lord Rokeby, stopped the publication. Sir John Hawkins recorded in his Life of Johnson that when Chesterfield wanted to appease Samuel Johnson, he employed Robinson as his mediator.

== Family ==
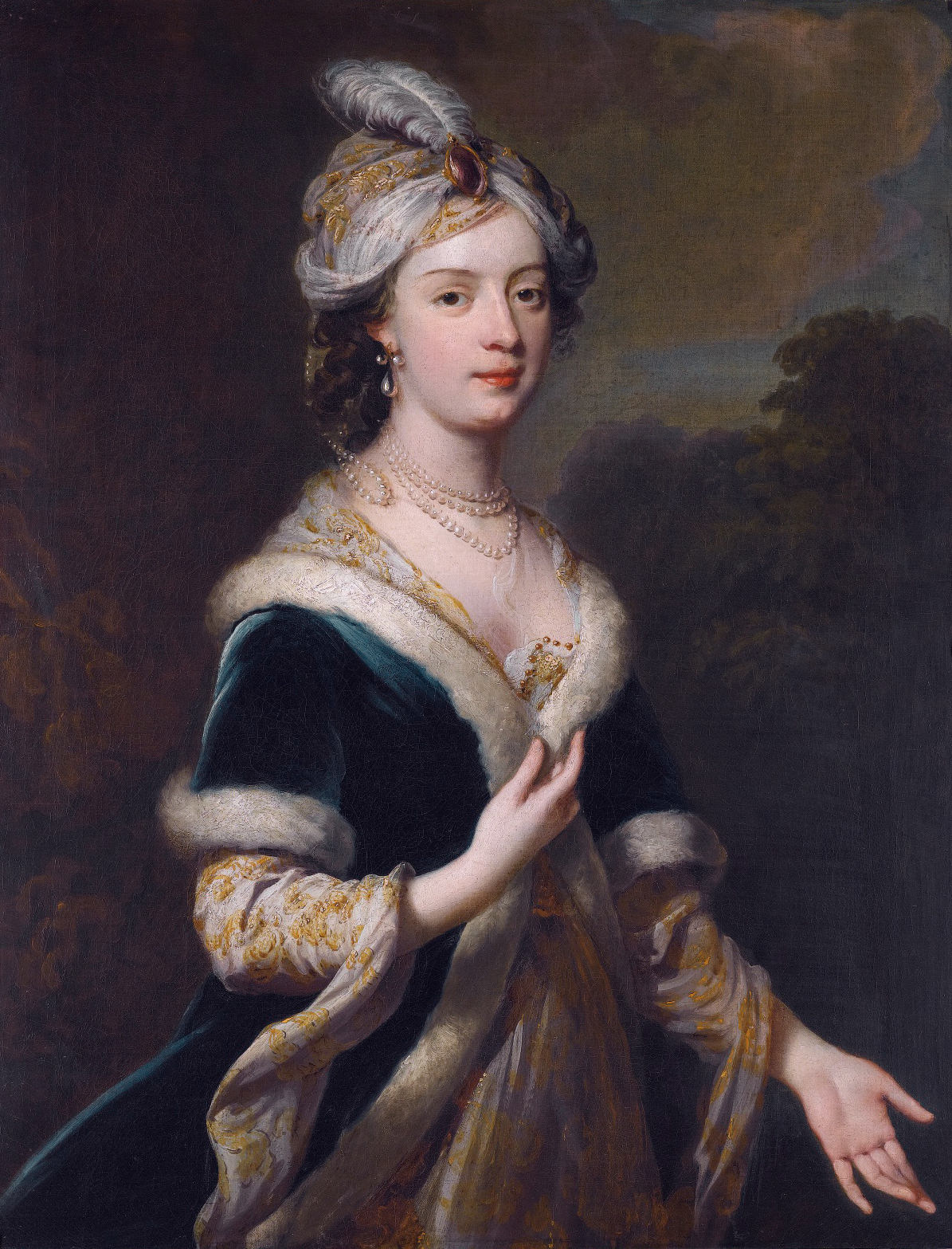
Elizabeth Howard by George Knapton

On 25 October 1728 Robinson married, at Belfrey's, York, Elizabeth, the eldest daughter of Charles Howard, 3rd Earl of Carlisle, and widow of Nicholas Lechmere, 1st Baron Lechmere. His first wife died at Bath, Somerset on 10 April 1739, and was buried in the family vault under the new church of Rokeby. He married at Barbados a second wife, whose maiden name was Booth; she was the widow of Samuel Salmon, a rich ironmonger. She declined to follow Robinson back to England.

Parliament of Great Britain
Preceded by Viscount Morpeth; Hon. George Carpenter	Member of Parliament for Morpeth; 1727–1734; With: Viscount Morpeth	Succeeded by Viscount Morpeth; Sir Henry Liddell
Government offices
Preceded by James Dotin, acting	Governor of Barbados; 1742–1747	Succeeded by Henry Grenville
Baronetage of Great Britain
New creation	Baronet (of Rokeby); 1730–1777	Succeeded by Sir William Robinson
