= William Lynch (diplomat) =

British diplomat and politician

Sir William Lynch (c. 1730 – 25 August 1785) was a British diplomat and politician who sat in the House of Commons between 1762 and 1780.

Lynch was the eldest son of John Lynch, DD Dean of Canterbury, and his wife Mary Wake, daughter of William Wake, Archbishop of Canterbury.

Lynch was elected Member of Parliament for Weobley at a by-election in 1762, and held the seat until 1768. He was then elected MP for Canterbury and held the seat until 1774. He was then returned again as MP for Weobley until he resigned in March 1780.

In September 1768 Lynch was appointed envoy extraordinary to the court of Turin and served from 1769 to 1776. He was appointed Knight of the Order of the Bath, and a privy counsellor.

In 1780, he inherited the Manor of Stalisfield, until his death.

Lynch lived at The Groves at Staple, Kent, where he made great improvements, adding two wings to the house and adding a new front of stucco. He built up a collection of pictures. He created parkland in the grounds and made extensive plantations.

Lynch died at Barèges in the south of France, where he went to drink the waters, and was interred at Staple in Kent.

Lynch married Mary Coke, daughter of Edward Coke of Canterbury, but had no issue.

Parliament of Great Britain
Preceded by Marquess of Titchfield; Hon. Henry Thynne	Member of Parliament for Weobley; 1762–1768; With: Hon. Henry Thynne	Succeeded by Simon Luttrell; Hon. Henry Thynne
Preceded by Richard Milles; Thomas Best	Member of Parliament for Canterbury; 1768–1774; With: Richard Milles	Succeeded by Richard Milles; Sir William Mayne
Preceded by Simon Luttrell; Bamber Gascoyne	Member of Parliament for Weobley; 1774–1780; With: John St Leger Douglas	Succeeded by Andrew Bayntun-Rolt; John St Leger Douglas
Diplomatic posts
Preceded by George Pitt	Minister at Turin; 1768–1776	Succeeded by John Stuart, Viscount Mountstuart
