= Violet Cressy-Marcks =

British explorer

Violet Olivia Cressy-Marcks (1895–1970) was a British explorer mainly active between the world wars.

== Personal life ==
Violet Cressy-Marcks was born Violet Olivia Rutley on 9 June 1895, in West Wickham, Greater London, the only daughter of Ernest and Olivia Rutley. On 13 October 1917 she married Maurice Cressy-Marcks, a captain in the North Lancashire regiment, with whom she had her first son, William, in 1921. They divorced and she married Francis Edwin Fisher of Watford, a farmer & meat wholesaler on 12 December 1931 with whom she had two more sons, named Ocean (born 1933) and Forest (born 1934). The family lived at Hazelwood House, now known as Hunton Park.

She died at her London home on 10 September 1970 and was buried at Langleybury church, Hertfordshire. Her will included a bequest in her name providing a travelling scholarship for geographical research in the field.

== Explorations ==
Cressy-Marcks was elected to the Royal Geographical Society (RGS) in 1922, described by her proposer as of independent means, already having "travelled extensively" from Alaska to Java and having made private "explorations in Tibet, Kashmiri etc."

Her journeys took her round the world many times. Though twice married, she principally travelled alone. Her extensive interests encompassed archaeology, zoology, ethnology and geography.

- 1925: Overland from Cairo to Cape Town;
- 1927-28: Albania and the Balkans;
- 1928: In February 1928 Cressy-Marcks arrived in Jeddah, in the Hejaz.
- 1928-29: spent the winter north of the Arctic Circle travelling by sledge from Lapland to Baluchistan.
- 1929-30: through the Amazon and Andes to Peru by canoe and foot, surveying part of the north-west Amazon basin;
- 1931–32: fourth Round the World journey;
- 1933: Spain;
- 1934: India, Kabul, Tashkent, and Moscow;
- 1935: she took the first motor transport from Addis Ababa to Nairobi (during the Italian invasion) and visited the Ethiopian and Eritrean war fronts taking cine film;
- 1937-38: she travelled from Mandela to Beijing over land; while in North West China she interviewed Mao Zedong for five hours at the remote cave dwellings at Yan'an that housed the wartime Communist Headquarters;
- 1943-45: she was a war reporter in Chongqing, in southwestern China, for the Daily Express
- During the Second World War she was an ambulance driver for the British Red Cross abroad;
- 1945-46: accredited to the War Office as war correspondent for the Daily Express at the Nuremberg trials;
- 1953–54: Indo-China, Kathmandu, and Japan;
- 1955: seventh Round the World journey;
- 1956: eighth Round the World journey (during which her husband died at Nassau).

Eventually credited with travelling in every country of the world, she was keen to have a scientific grounding to her travels, and was a fellow of the Royal Asiatic and Zoological Societies.

She was also a capable cinematographer and photographer, bringing films and photographs from many of her travels including politically sensitive areas. She studied in Arabia and undertook widespread archaeological studies including Egypt, Syria, Palestine, Persia, Java, China, Ethiopia, Afghanistan, and the Khmer, Inca, Aztec, and Mesopotamian peoples. Although she was regarded primarily as an archaeologist, part of her remit was to collect contemporary ethnological data on ethnic groups little known in the West.

In her will she requested that a copy of her biography be shown to the chief of MI5 "for his appreciation", as well as entrusting that biography to (the then deceased) Bernard Rickatson-Hatt, who had spent three years in intelligence in Constantinople (as well as editor-in-chief for Reuters), suggesting sponsorship from the secret service for some of her many travels. These coincided with periods of international political sensitivity on a number of occasions. She often achieved largely unfettered travel, as in the case of Russia where she availed herself of permission to travel wherever she wanted and visited most of the Foreign Office officials (as she reported to Mao).

== Books ==
- Cressy-Marcks, Violet (1932). Up the Amazon and over the Andes. London: Hodder and Stoughton. ISBN 978-1-906393-03-8.

'A snake crawling over one at night is… not a pleasant proposition… The wretched thing had bitten me below the knee…' Having lanced the wound, she found a mirror 'to see if I was going black or grey… I decided on coffee, a walk and sleep, and if I was going to die… I was at peace with the world - so … there was nothing to worry about'.

- Cressy-Marcks, Violet (1940). Journey into China.
