= Portrait of Richard Milles =

Painting by Pompeo Batoni

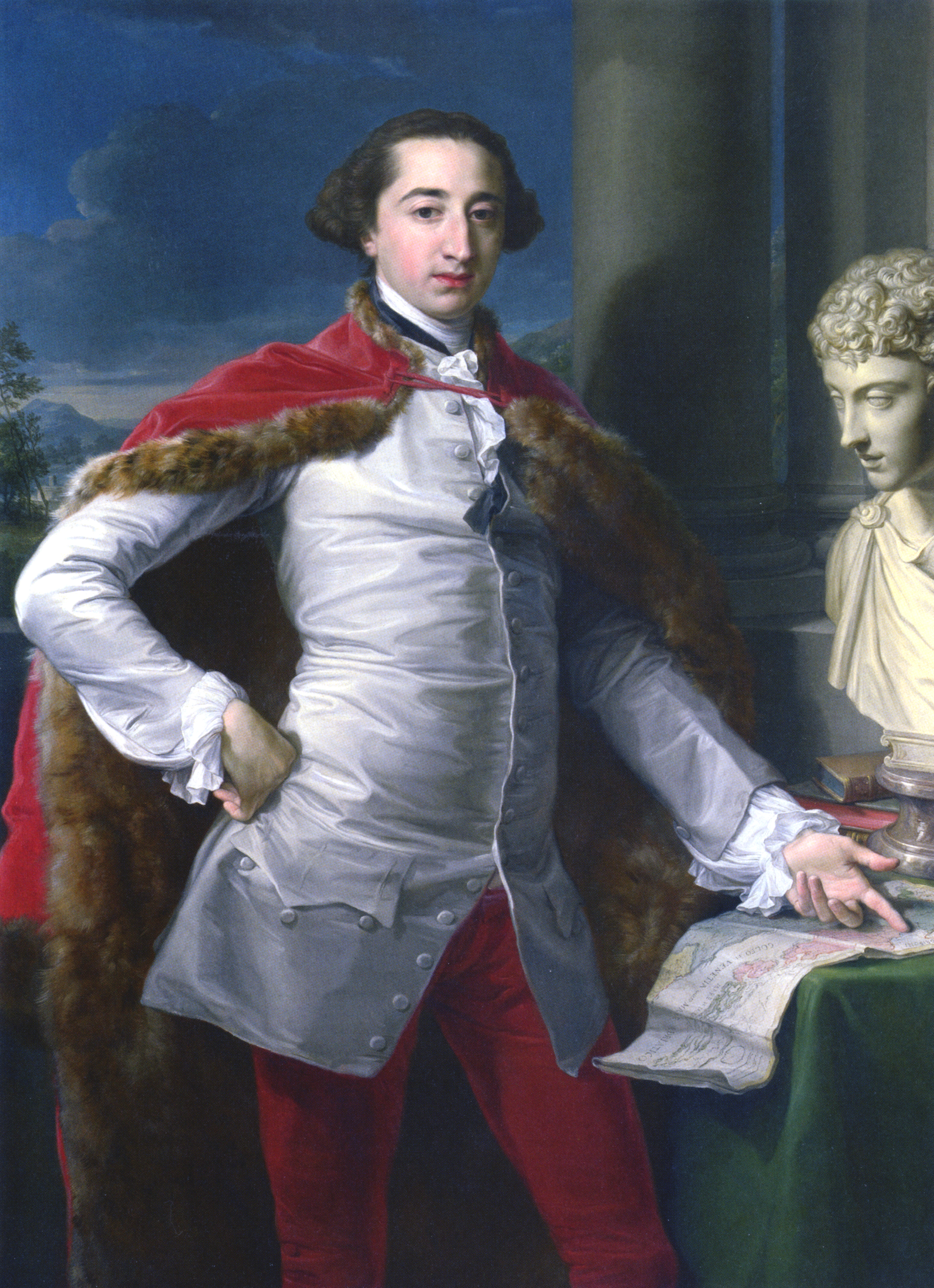
- Artist: Pompeo Batoni
- Year: ca. 1760–1770
- Medium: Oil on canvas
- Dimensions: 134,6 cm × 96,3 cm (530 in × 379 in)
- Location: National Gallery, London
- Website: https://www.nationalgallery.org.uk/paintings/pompeo-girolamo-batoni-portrait-of-richard-milles

Portrait of Richard Milles is an oil-on-canvas portrait painting created ca. the 1760s by the Italian artist Pompeo Batoni. It is now in the National Gallery, London. Its subject is the English landowner and politician Richard Milles, who probably had it painted during a visit to Rome on his Grand Tour. He points to the Canton of Grisons on a map, with a bust of Marcus Aurelius in the background. Batoni also produced a miniature head of Milles, which is now in the Fitzwilliam Museum in Cambridge.
