= Richard Robinson, 1st Baron Rokeby =

Anglo-Irish cleric and peer

The Most Reverend and Right Honourable The Lord Rokeby PC (Ire), D.D.
- Archbishop of Armagh; Primate of All Ireland
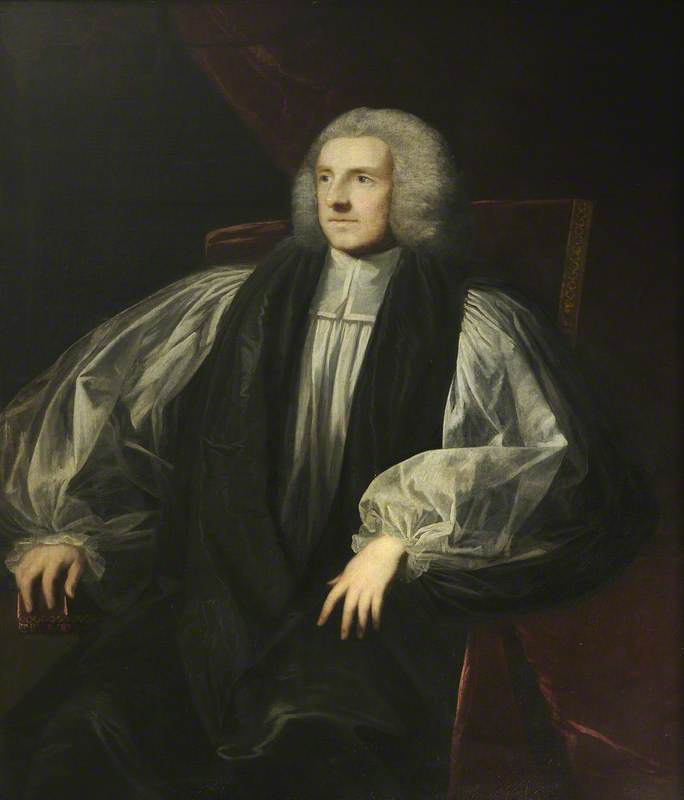
- Lord Rokeby by Sir Joshua Reynolds
- Church: Church of Ireland
- See: Armagh
- Appointed: 8 February 1765
- In office: 1765-1794
- Predecessor: George Stone
- Successor: William Newcome
- Previous posts: Bishop of Killala and Achonry (1751-1759); Bishop of Ferns and Leighlin (1759-1761); Bishop of Kildare (1761-1765)

Orders
- Consecration: 19 January 1752 by Charles Cobbe

Personal details
- Born: baptised 13 July 1708
- Died: 10 October 1794 (aged 86) Clifton, Bristol, England
- Buried: St Patrick's Cathedral, Armagh
- Denomination: Anglican
- Education: Westminster School
- Alma mater: Christ Church, Oxford

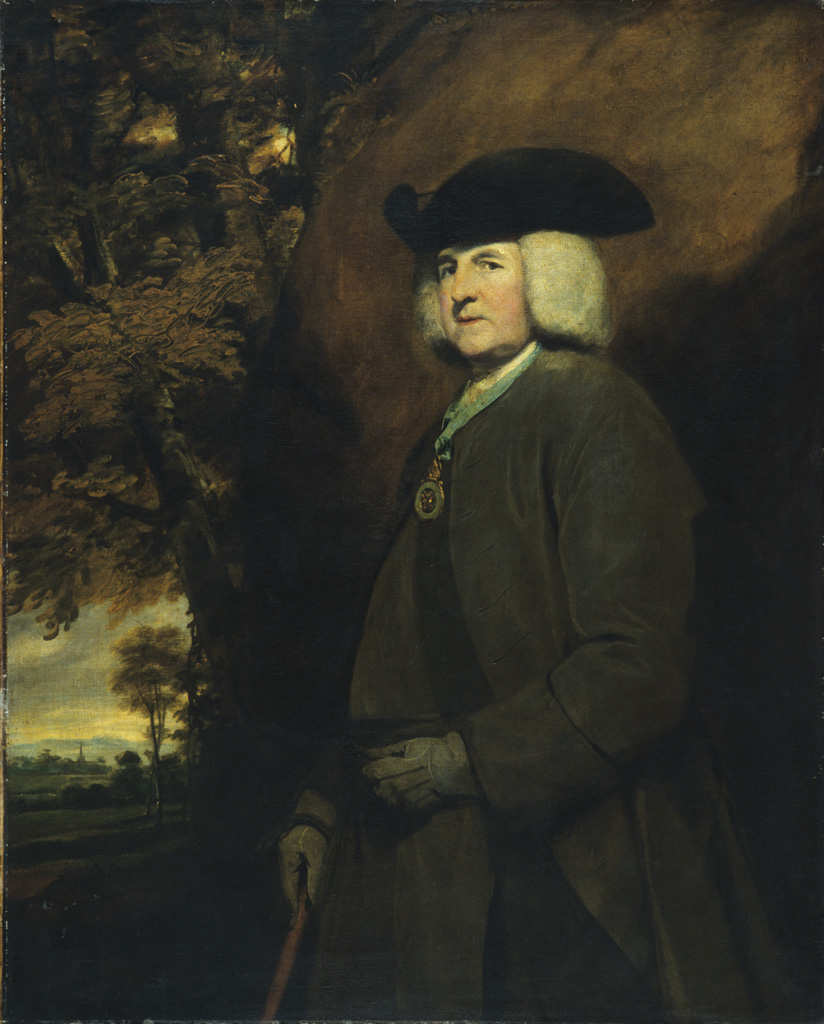
Portrait de Richard Robinson, archevêque d'Armagh, futur baron de Rokeby et primat d'Irlande, by Sir Joshua Reynolds, PRA, in the Musée des Beaux-Arts-mairie de Bordeaux.

Richard Robinson, 1st Baron Rokeby (1708 – 10 October 1794), was an Anglo-Irish churchman.

== Life ==
He was a younger son of William Robinson (died 1720) of Rokeby, Yorkshire and later of Merton, Surrey and Anne Walters (died 1730), daughter and heiress of Robert Walters of Cundall. Sir Thomas Robinson, 1st Baronet (1703-1777) was his elder brother. He was educated at Westminster School and Christ Church, Oxford (BA 1730, MA 1733, BD & DD 1748).

Robinson came to Ireland as chaplain to Lionel Sackville, 1st Duke of Dorset in 1751 when Dorset was reappointed Lord Lieutenant of Ireland, and was swiftly raised to the Irish episcopate as Bishop of Killala and Achonry. He was translated from the See of Kildare, which he had occupied since 1761, to the Archbishopric of Armagh in 1765.

In 1777 he was created Baron Rokeby, of Armagh in the County of Armagh, in the Peerage of Ireland, with special remainder to Matthew Robinson (1694–1778) of West Layton, in the North Riding of the county of Yorkshire, his second cousin, twice removed, who predeceased him.

In 1774 he founded the County Infirmary. In 1780 he donated land for the erection of a new prison and in 1771 he founded the Armagh Public Library. In 1790 he founded the Armagh Observatory as part of his plan for a university in Armagh.

Archbishop Lord Rokeby died at Clifton in Bristol on 10 October 1794, and was buried in Armagh Cathedral. He was succeeded by Matthew Robinson, 2nd Baron Rokeby, the son of his second cousin Matthew Robinson, who inherited his titles, and was a noted eccentric.

There is a memorial to Robinson in the south aisle at St Patrick's Cathedral, Armagh.

== Reputation ==
Robert Walpole called Robinson 'a proud but superficial man'. John Wesley accused him of being more interested in buildings than in the care of souls.

Richard Cumberland described him as "splendid, liberal, lofty ... publicly ambitious of great deeds, and privately capable of good ones, ... he made no court to popularity by his manners but he benefited a whole nation by his public works".

== Architectural benefactor ==
The Canterbury Gate at Christ Church, Oxford, completed in 1873, is one monument to Archbishop Lord Rokeby's munificence. The gate is inscribed:

MUNIFICENTIA ALUMNORUM PRAECIPUE RICARDI ROBINSON ARCHICEP. ARMAGH.
(By the munificence of alumni, especially of Richard Robinson, Archbishop of Armagh.)

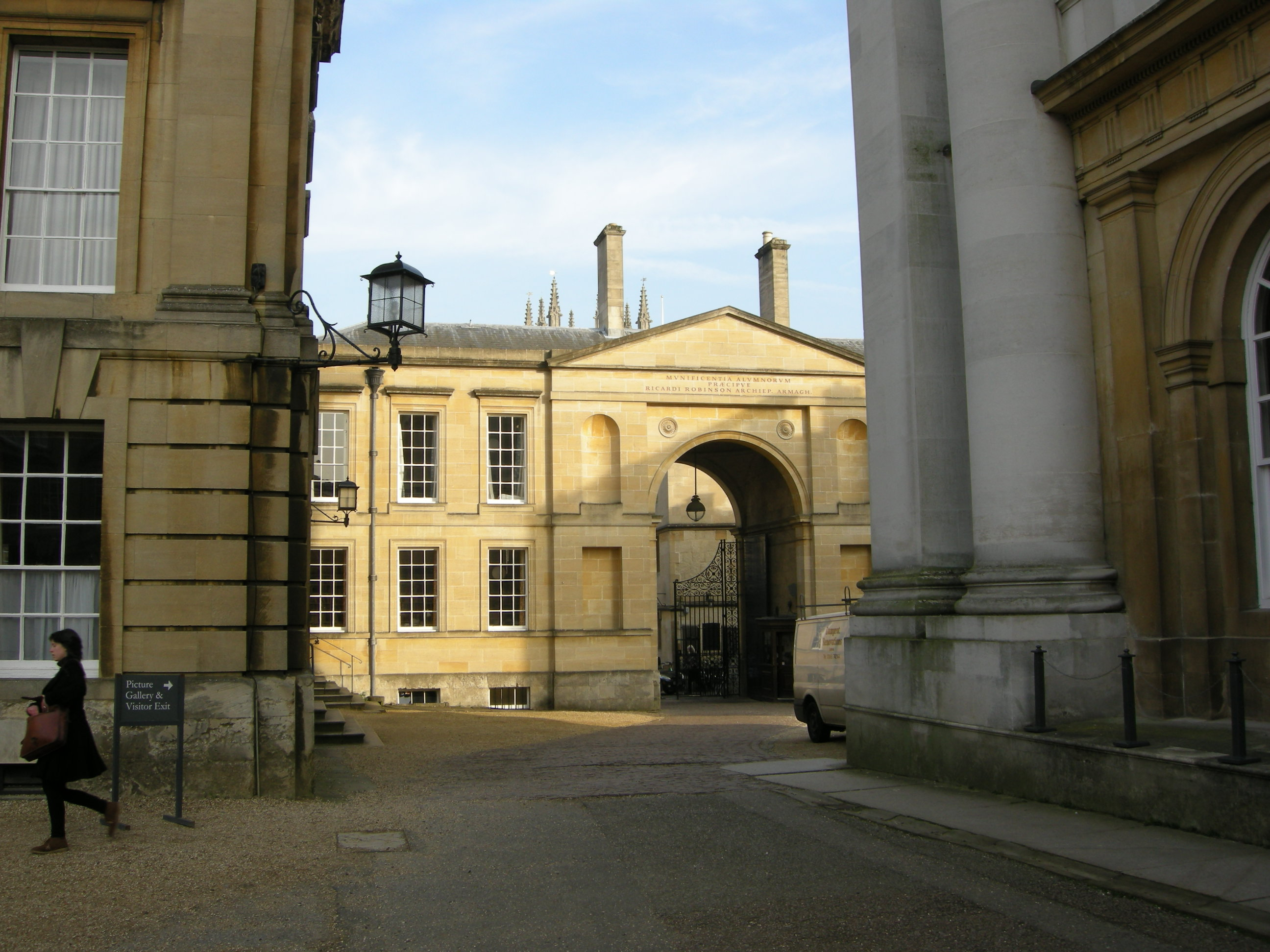
The Canterbury Gate, Christ Church, Oxford

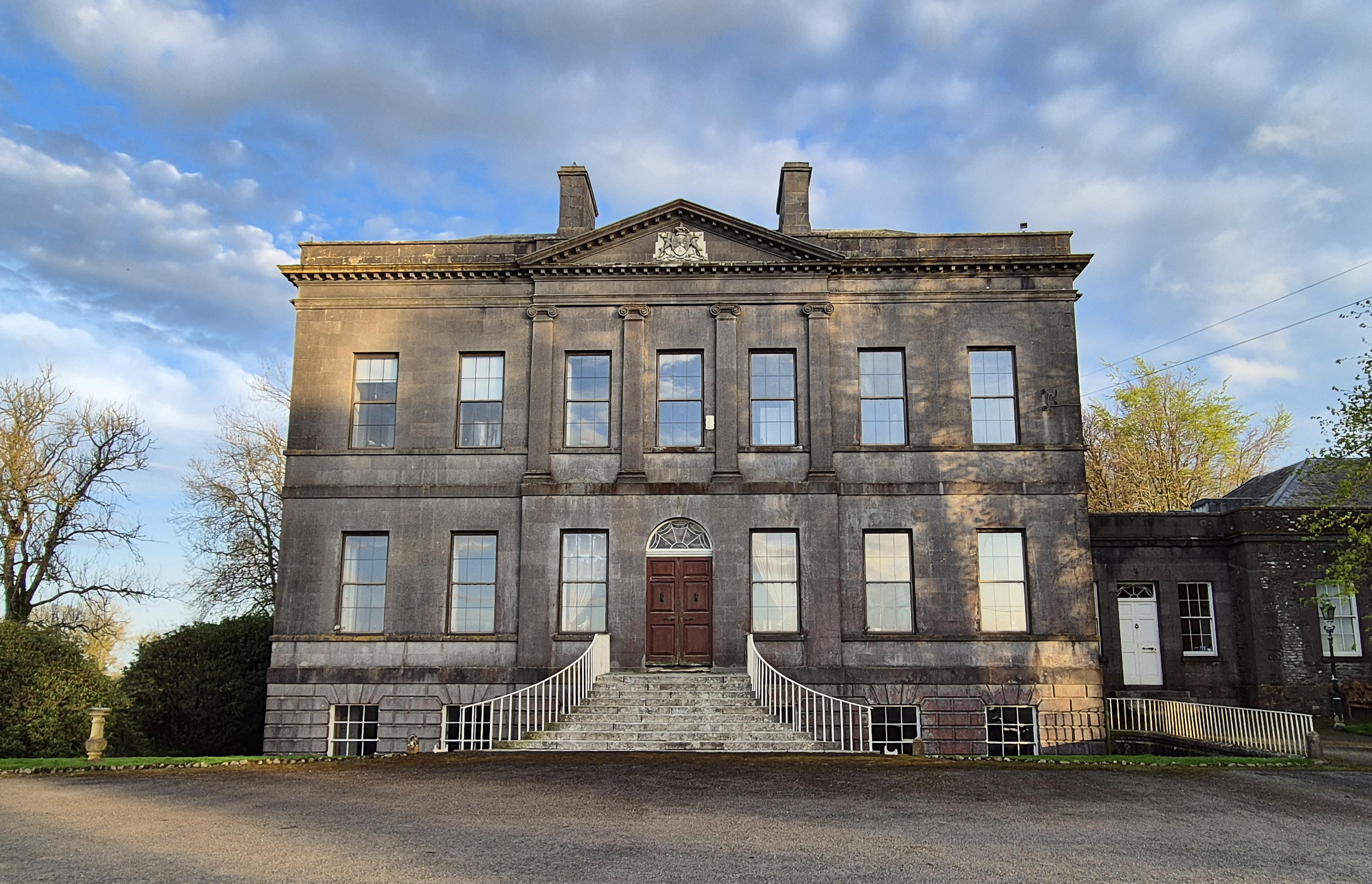
Robinson's Rokeby Hall, near Dunleer, County Louth, Ireland, by Cooley and Johnston

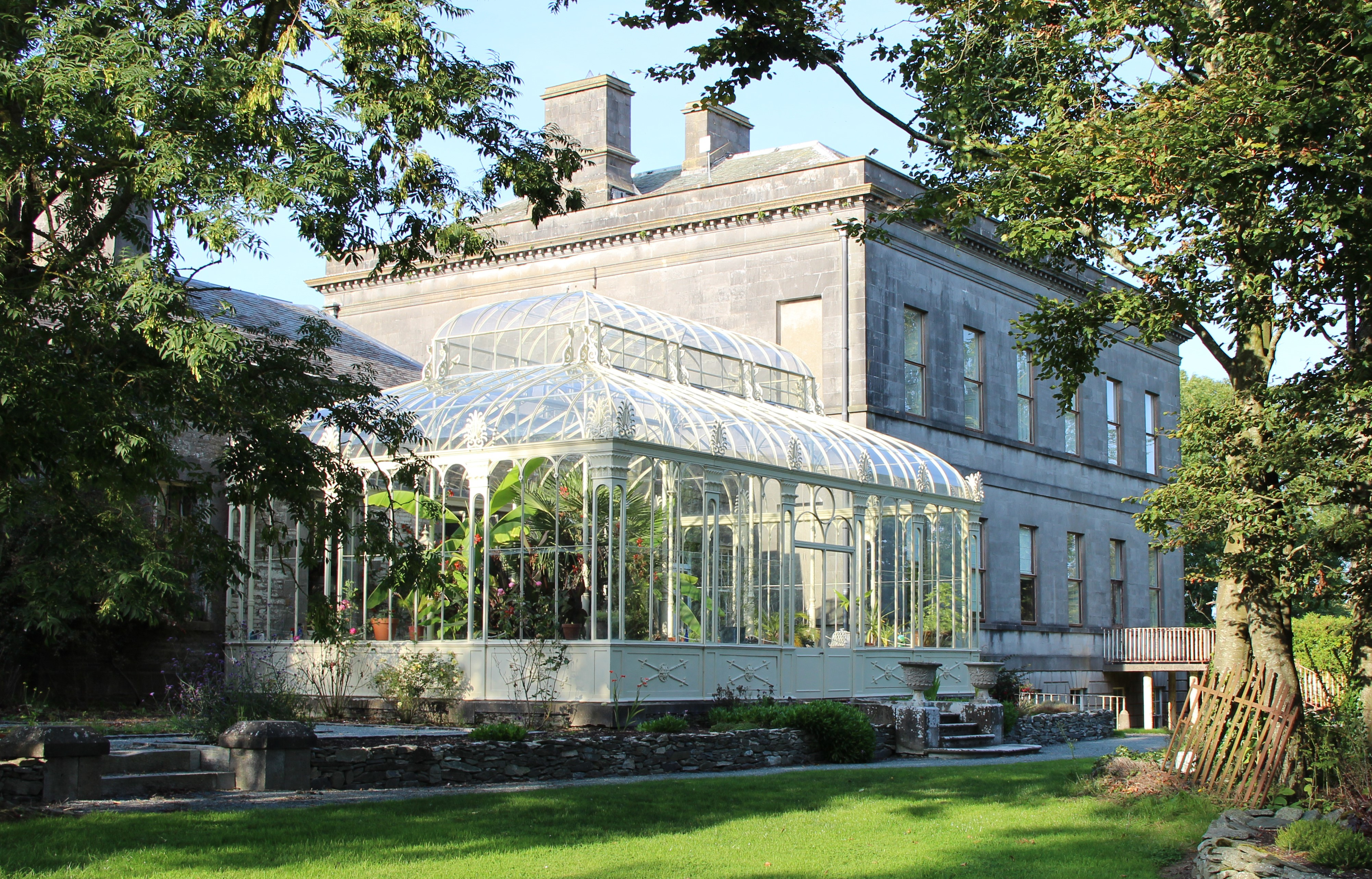
Robinson's Rokeby Hall, and its conservatory

Church of Ireland titles
Preceded by Mordecai Cary	Bishop of Killala and Achonry; 1752–1759	Succeeded by Samuel Hutchinson
Preceded by Thomas Salmon	Bishop of Ferns and Leighlin; 1759–1761	Succeeded by Charles Jackson
Preceded by Thomas Fletcher	Bishop of Kildare; 1761–1765	Succeeded by Charles Jackson
Preceded by George Stone	Archbishop of Armagh; 1765–1794	Succeeded by William Newcome
Baronetage of England
Preceded by William Robinson	Baronet (of Rokeby Park); 1785–1794	Succeeded by Matthew Robinson
Peerage of Ireland
New creation	Baron Rokeby; 1777–1794	Succeeded by Matthew Robinson
