= Thomas Best (MP for Canterbury) =

English Tory politician

Thomas Best (born 1713 – 26 March 1795) was an English Tory politician who sat in the House of Commons in two periods between 1741 and 1768.

Best was the son of Mawdistly Best and his wife, Elizabeth Fearne. The family were brewers of Chatham. He was educated at University College, Oxford.

In 1741, Best was elected Member of Parliament (MP) for Canterbury and held the seat to 1747. He sought re-election in 1754, but withdrew before the election because he did not expect to gain enough support. He was elected MP for Canterbury again in 1761 in a sharply contested election and held the seat until he was defeated in 1768.

Best lived at Chilston Park, Boughton Malherbe. He was lieutenant-governor of Dover Castle and deputy warden of the Cinque Ports from 1762 until his death at the age of 81.

Best married Caroline Scott daughter of George Scott of Scotts Hall on 3 January 1743. They had no children and he left his property to his nephew George Best.

Parliament of Great Britain
Preceded by Sir Thomas Hales, Bt; Thomas May	Member of Parliament for Canterbury; 1741–1754; With: Thomas Watson 1741–1745; Sir Thomas Hales, Bt 1745–1747; Matthew Robinson-Morris 1747–1754	Succeeded by Matthew Robinson-Morris; Sir James Creed
Preceded by Matthew Robinson-Morris; Sir James Creed	Member of Parliament for Canterbury; 1761–1768; With: Richard Milles	Succeeded by Richard Milles; William Lynch
