= Hunton Park =

Country house and estate in Hertfordshire, England

Coordinates: 51.693123°N 0.425034°W

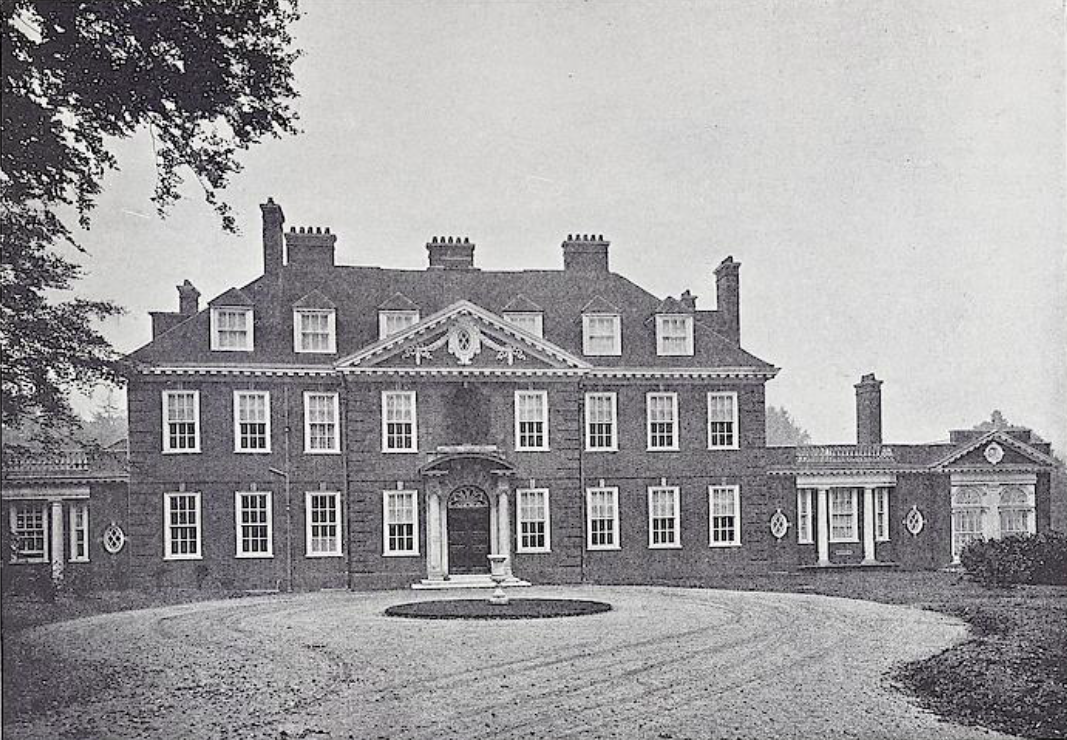
As Hazelwood House illustrated in The Studio Yearbook of Decorative Art 1911

Hunton Park is a large country house and estate in Abbots Langley, in south west Hertfordshire, in the United Kingdom. It was originally called Hazelwood House when first built in the early 19th century. The original house was destroyed in 1908 and completely rebuilt. It is now a hotel owned by the Khanna family.

== History ==
A wealthy Londoner Henry Botham built the first Hazelwood House from around 1810 as a country residence. Between 1810 and 1826 he acquired some 53 acres (21 ha) of surrounding land as a park. The ownership of Hazelwood House stayed in the Botham family for many years. It later passed around 1850 to Sir Henry Robinson Montagu, the 6th Lord Rokeby, a soldier who had fought at Waterloo as a 16-year-old Ensign and later commanded a division of the British army in the Crimean War. Other notable owners include Admiral Ralph Cator from 1886 and the Vicar of Honingham, Henry Stewart Gladstone in the early 20th century. Gladstone made a thousand pounds worth of improvements to the property, but a fire on 8 March 1908 completely destroyed the house, and it had to be demolished. Assisted by an insurance compensation of £10,500, Gladstone built the second Hazelwood House, similar in appearance to the first, but sited at a different angle to the ornamental grounds.

In 1930, the house was sold to Francis Edwin Fisher, a substantial landowner, farmer, meat wholesaler and businessman who frequently travelled the world with his wife, the explorer and journalist Violet Cressy-Marcks. During their absences, the house was left empty or rented out. Among the short-term occupants of this period was the Emperor Haile Selassie of Ethiopia, an exile from his country after the invasion by Italy in 1936.

From 1939 to 1971, the house went through various uses and often stood empty. Part of the estate was taken over by the Ministry of Defence for aircraft manufacture, later becoming the Rolls-Royce aircraft factory, and, in the 1990s, Leavesden Film Studios. In the 1970s, the cinema industry became interested in the house as a location, and a number of the Hammer House of Horror Productions were filmed there (including Lust For a Vampire as well as The Executioner directed by Sam Wanamaker, and The Raging Moon (1971) by director Bryan Forbes. Shortly after this period, Paul Edwin Hember, the owner of several small businesses, bought the house and changed its name to Hunton Park.
