= Charles Jackson (bishop) =

18th-century Anglican bishop in Ireland

Charles Jackson was an 18th-century Anglican bishop in Ireland.

He was consecrated Bishop of Ferns and Leighlin on 19 April 1761 and translated to Kildare in 1765. As Bishop of Kildare he was also simultaneously Dean of Christ Church Cathedral, Dublin as the two posts were held in commendam. A member of the Royal Dublin Society, he died on 29 March 1790.

Religious titles
Preceded by Richard Robinson	Bishop of Kildare; Dean of Christ Church Cathedral, Dublin; 1765–1790	Succeeded by George Lewis Jones
