= Henry Robinson-Montagu, 6th Baron Rokeby =

British Army general

General The Right Honourable The Lord Rokeby GCB
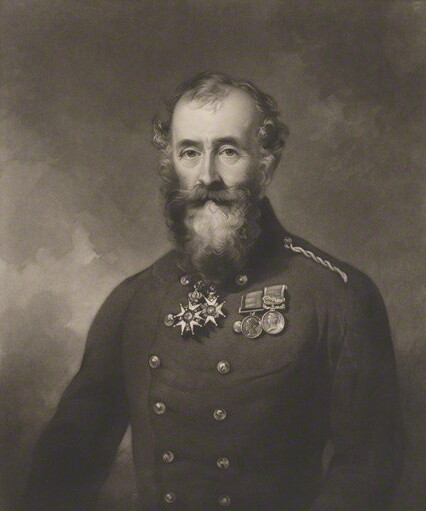
- Mezzotint of Rokeby, by George Zobel after Sir Francis Grant, 1858
- Born: 2 February 1798
- Died: 25 May 1883 (aged 85)
- Burial place: Clewer
- Military career
- Allegiance: United Kingdom
- Branch: British Army
- Service years: 1814–1877
- Rank: General
- Commands: 1st Division; Brigade of Guards
- Conflicts: Hundred Days; Battle of Quatre Bras; Battle of Waterloo; Crimean War; Siege of Sevastopol
- Awards: Legion of Honour (France); Sardinian Crimea Medal (Sardinia); Turkish Crimea Medal (Ottoman); Order of the Medjidie (Ottoman)

General Henry Robinson-Montague, 6th Baron Rokeby, GCB (2 February 1798 – 25 May 1883) was a senior British Army officer of the 19th century.

== Military career ==
Born the son of the 4th Baron, Rokeby was commissioned into the 3rd Foot Guards in 1814. He fought at the Battle of Quatre Bras and the Battle of Waterloo in June 1815.

He fought in the Crimean War as Commander of the 1st Division in 1855. After the war, in 1856, he was appointed to the new post of major-general commanding the Brigade of Guards. He retired from the post five years later in 1861. He was promoted to general in 1869 and retired in 1877.

The peerage became extinct on his death on 25 May 1883. He lived at Hazelwood, Abbots Langley, Hertfordshire from 1838 until his death.

== Family ==
In 1826 he married Magdalen Huxley or Hurley, the widow of Frederick Crofts. Their children included:

- Hon. Harriet Lydia Montagu, (d. 23 November 1894), she married the 4th Earl of Portarlington;
- Hon. Mary Montagu, (d. 6 September 1868), she married the 14th Marquess of Winchester. By 1895 Lord Henry Paulet, later 16th Marquess of Winchester, was in possession of the family's Denton estate in Northumberland;
- Hon. Magdalen Montagu, (d. 30 September 1919), she married the Very Rev. Hon. Gerald Wellesley, Dean of Windsor, son of Lord Cowley. By 1895 the Eryholme estate in Yorkshire was in her possession;
- Hon. Edmund Montagu, (1835–1852).

== Agricultural Estates in 1883 ==
- North Riding of Yorkshire (Eryholme), 2,835 acres (worth 4,021 guineas per annum);
- Northumberland (Denton), 1,622 acres (worth 4,137 guineas per annum);
- Hertfordshire (Hazlewood, Watford), 348 acres (worth 911 guineas per annum);
- Cambridge, 55 acres (worth 102 guineas per annum);
- Kent, 3 acres (worth 9 guineas per annum).

Military offices
New title New Post	Major-General commanding the Brigade of Guards; 1856–1861	Succeeded by James Craufurd
Preceded by Sir John Aitchison	Colonel of the Scots Guards; 1875–1883	Succeeded by Sir William Thomas Knollys
Preceded by Sir George Leigh Goldie	Colonel of the 77th (East Middlesex) Regiment of Foot; 1861–1875	Succeeded by Henry Hope Graham
Peerage of Ireland
Preceded by Edward Montagu	Baron Rokeby; 1847–1883	Extinct
