= Matthew Robinson, 2nd Baron Rokeby =

English landowner & politician (1713–1800)

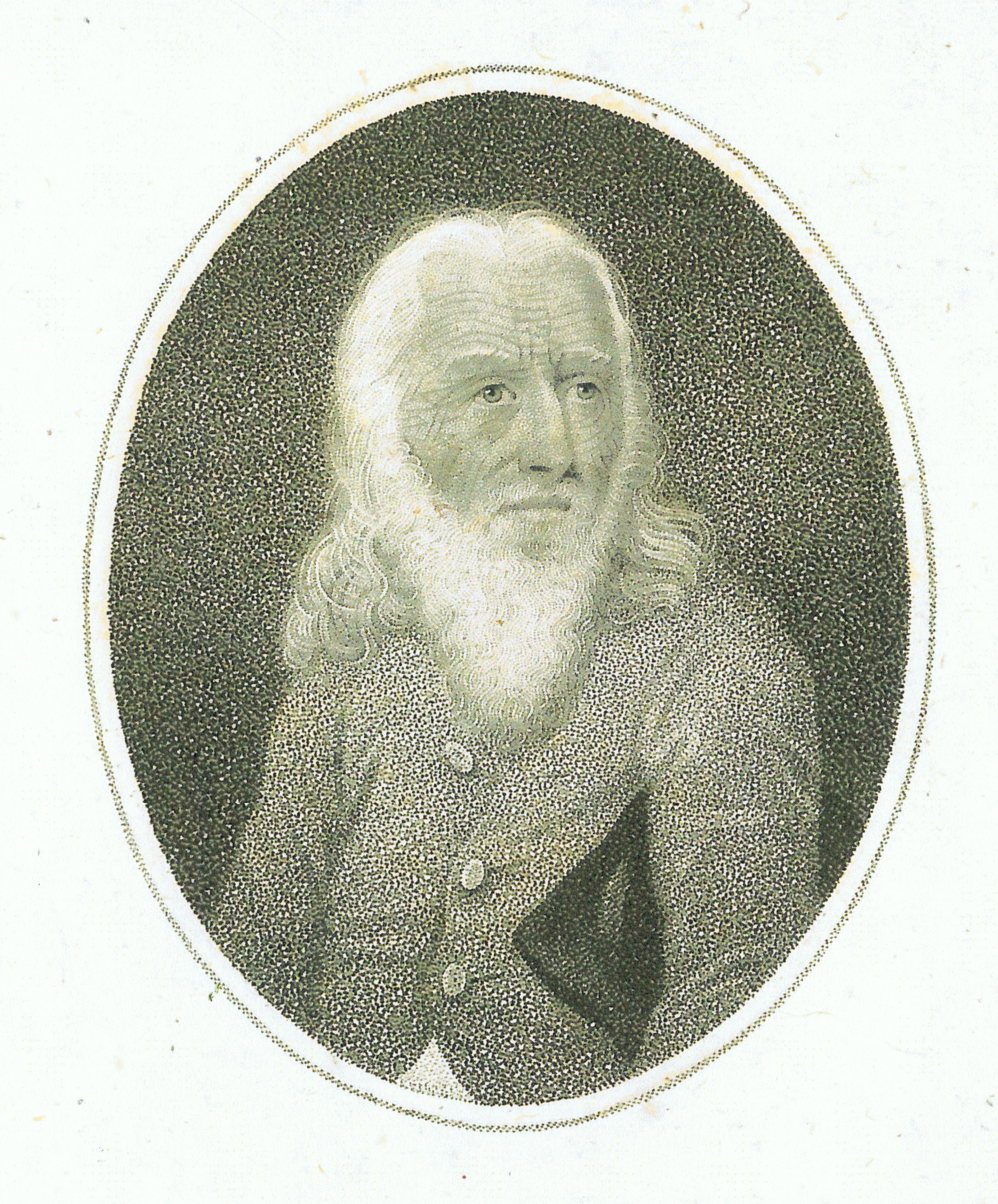
Lord Rokeby, stipple engraving, with tricorn hat.

Matthew Robinson, 2nd Baron Rokeby (Baptised, York 12 April 1713 – 30 November 1800), FRS, was an English landowner, politician and nobleman. In later life, he was considered an eccentric.

Lord Rokeby, Drawn from Life, and engraved by Chapman, stipple engraving by John Chapman (active 1792 -1823).

Lord Rokeby, print of him published in a magazine, 1 August 1808.

== Early life ==
Lord Rokeby was born Matthew Robinson in a large family from Yorkshire. His parents were Matthew Robinson (1694–1778) of Edgely and West Layton, Yorkshire, and Elizabeth, daughter of Robert Drake of Cambridge; his sisters included the novelists Elizabeth Montagu and Sarah Scott. Of his six brothers, Thomas the second was known as a legal writer, William the fifth as a cleric, and the youngest, Charles, as a Member of Parliament. His father inherited property in the neighbourhood of Rokeby from his great-uncle Matthew Robinson, rector of Burneston; and his mother inherited the Mount Morris estate at Monks Horton, near Hythe, Kent, from her brother Morris Drake Morris, which Rokeby in turn succeeded to in 1746.

Robinson was admitted to Lincoln's Inn in 1730, and to Trinity Hall, Cambridge in 1731. He became a Fellow there in 1734. In 1746 his mother died and he inherited her Monks Horton property. As a consequence, he then assumed the additional name of Morris.

In November 1746 he became a Fellow of the Royal Society. The Royal Society citation reads: Mathew Robinson Esqr, A Gentleman well versed in Philosophical Learning, and polite Literature; being desirous of becoming a fellow of this Society, We on our personal knowledge do recommend him as every way qualified and likely to become a useful Member of our Body. His proposers were Edw Montagu (brother-in-law); Daniel Wray; Geo Lewis Scott (brother-in-law); Henry Baker; Robt Smith; M Folkes.

He was elected as a Bailiff to the board of the Bedford Level Corporation in 1756, a position he held until 1763.

Robinson-Morris represented Canterbury in Parliament, from 1747 to 1761 including managing to hold the constituency without expense in 1754; in politics he was a Whig. He inherited the title Lord Rokeby in 1794 after the death of his father's second cousin, The 1st Baron Rokeby, Church of Ireland Lord Primate of All Ireland and Lord Archbishop of Armagh.

== Supposed eccentric ==
The 2nd Lord Rokeby became an enthusiastic supporter of baths during a holiday in the spa town of Aix-la-Chapelle. When he returned to Kent, he began to make daily trips to the seashore to swim in salt water regardless of the weather. He preferred this environment to such an extent that his servant had to persuade him to come home. Sometimes he fainted and had to be rescued. He had a hut built for him on the sands at Hythe and drinking fountains along his route to the beach. He walked all the way and let his servant follow him in the carriage with full livery. If he found people drinking from a fountain, he gave them a half-crown coin.

He also let his beard grow, which was against the contemporary fashion. Eventually, it was so thick that it stuck out under his arms and could be seen from behind. In a couple of years, he decided to build a swimming pool in his mansion - it was built under glass and was heated by the sun. There he spent hours at a time, preferably alone. He refused to have a fire in his house even in the coldest weather.

His increased isolation bred rumours, including one that he was a cannibal or ate only raw meat - when he ate mainly beef tea and nibbled at venison. He also refused to see any doctors. As for church service, he claimed that God was best worshipped at natural altars of the earth, the sea and the sky - not to mention that the sermons were boring.

When Lord Rokeby did indeed agree to accept visitors, he might "entertain" them with lengthy, boring poems. He arranged a sumptuous meal for Prince William of Gloucester but ate very little himself. He very rarely visited the court and then was an embarrassment to his socialite sister, Elizabeth Montagu. When he stayed at the Chequers Inn at Lenham in 1796 so he could vote in the general election, curious locals took him for a Turk.

In January 1755 Mrs. Montagu wrote to their sister, Sarah Scott: 'Brother Robinson is emulating the great Diogenes and other ... doctors of the stoic fur; he flies the life of London and leads a life of such privacy and seriousness as looks to the beholder like wisdom', and in 1756 she reported that he now lived upon almost raw meat, never touched bread, considering corn exotic, and for the same reason substituted honey for sugar.

== Death ==
Lord Rokeby died in December 1800, peacefully in his bed. His title and estates passed to his nephew Morris Robinson, 3rd Baron Rokeby. His tomb in Armagh Cathedral is sculpted by John Bacon.

Parliament of Great Britain
Preceded by Sir Thomas Hales, 2nd Baronet; Thomas Best	Member of Parliament for Canterbury; 1747–1761; With: Thomas Best; Sir James Creed	Succeeded by Thomas Best; Richard Milles
Peerage of Ireland
Preceded by Richard Robinson	Baron Rokeby; 1794–1800	Succeeded by Morris Robinson
