= West Berkshire Council elections =

Local government elections in Berkshire, England

West Berkshire Council is the local authority for West Berkshire, a unitary authority in Berkshire, England. Until 1 April 1998 it was a non-metropolitan district called Newbury.

== Council elections ==
Composition of the council
Year	Conservative	Labour	Liberal Democrats (Note: Includes totals for the predecessors of the Liberal Democrats, the Liberal Party and SDP (both of which participated in the Alliance).)	Green (Note: Includes totals for the predecessors of the Green Party of England and Wales, the Ecology Party and Green Party UK.)	Independents & Others	Council control after election
Local government reorganisation; council established (57 seats)
1973	13	1	26	–	17	No overall control
1976	29	1	15	0	12	Conservative
1979	33	1	19	0	4	Conservative
New ward boundaries (45 seats)
1983	35	0	10	0	0	Conservative
1987	34	0	11	0	0	Conservative
1991	20	0	24	0	1	Liberal Democrats
1995	7	0	37	0	1	Liberal Democrats
West Berkshire becomes a unitary authority; new ward boundaries (54 seats) (Note: On becoming a unitary authority, the council changed its name from Newbury to West Berkshire.)
1997	15	0	38	0	1	Liberal Democrats
2000	25	0	28	0	1	Liberal Democrats
New ward boundaries (52 seats)
2003	26	0	26	0	0	No overall control
2007	36	0	16	0	0	Conservative
2011	39	0	13	0	0	Conservative
2015	48	0	4	0	0	Conservative
New ward boundaries (43 seats)
2019	24	0	16	3	0	Conservative
2023	11	1	29	2	0	Liberal Democrats

== Results maps ==
2003 results map

2007 results map

2011 results map

2015 results map

2019 results map

2023 results map

== By-elections ==
=== 2003-2007 ===
Victoria By-Election 4 December 2003
Party	Candidate	Votes	%	±%
Liberal Democrats	Roger Hunneman	727	58.6	−5.3
Conservative	Jeffrey Beck	461	37.2	+6.8
Labour	Barry Lambert	52	4.2	+4.2
Majority		266	21.5	
Turnout		1,240		
Liberal Democrats hold		Swing		

Thatcham North By-Election 5 May 2005
Party	Candidate	Votes	%	±%
Conservative	Sheila Ellison	1,431	53.3	+15.3
Liberal Democrats	Graham Reeves	1,256	46.7	−15.3
Majority		175	6.6	
Turnout		2,687		
Conservative gain from Liberal Democrats		Swing		

Pangbourne By-Election 20 April 2006
Party	Candidate	Votes	%	±%
Conservative		725	74.6	+0.4
Liberal Democrats		151	15.5	−0.4
Labour		96	9.9	+0.0
Majority		574	59.1	
Turnout		972		
Conservative hold		Swing		

=== 2007-2011 ===
Thatcham South and Crookham By-Election 22 July 2010
Party	Candidate	Votes	%	±%
Liberal Democrats	Bob Morgan	936	58.6	+1.9
Conservative	Dominic Boeck	787	45.7	−1.9
Majority		149	8.6	
Turnout		1,723		
Liberal Democrats hold		Swing		

=== 2011-2015 ===
Hungerford By-Election 15 August 2013
Party	Candidate	Votes	%	±%
Conservative	James Podger	810	48.4	−12.6
Liberal Democrats	Denise Gaines	751	44.8	+5.8
Labour	Gary Puffett	86	5.1	+5.1
Independent	Andrew Stott	28	1.7	+1.7
Majority		59	3.5	
Turnout		1,675		
Conservative hold		Swing		

Purley on Thames By-Election 28 January 2015
Party	Candidate	Votes	%	±%
Conservative	Rick Jones	936	68.1	+1.0
Labour	Ian Stevens	172	12.5	−8.7
UKIP	Catherine Anderson	163	11.9	+11.9
Liberal Democrats	Steve Bown	104	7.6	−4.1
Majority		764	55.6	
Turnout		1,375		
Conservative hold		Swing		

=== 2015-2019 ===
Thatcham South and Crookham By-Election 8 June 2017
Party	Candidate	Votes	%	±%
Conservative	Jason Collis	1,823	48.7	−0.6
Liberal Democrats	Owen Jeffery	822	22.0	−6.1
Green	Stephen Masters	590	15.8	+3.6
Labour	Nicholas East	505	13.5	+3.0
Majority		1,001	26.8	
Turnout		3,740		
Conservative hold		Swing		

Thatcham West 19 April 2018
Party	Candidate	Votes	%	±%
Liberal Democrats	Jeff Brooks	820	48.4	+11.2
Conservative	Ellen Crumly	523	30.9	−18.1
Labour	Louise Coulson	130	7.7	−6.2
Green	Jane Livermore	130	7.7	+7.7
UKIP	Gary Johnson	91	5.4	+5.4
Registered electors		4,957		
Turnout		1,702	34.3	−34.3
Liberal Democrats gain from Conservative		Swing	14.7	

=== 2019-2023 ===
Tilehurst South and Holybrook, 16 December 2021
Party	Candidate	Votes	%	±%
Conservative	Akinbiyi Oloko	548	42.3	−15.6
Labour	Charles Croal	387	29.9	+4.8
Liberal Democrats	Steve Bown	359	27.7	+10.8
Registered electors		5,652		
Turnout		1,302	23	−5
Conservative hold		Swing	-11.6	

=== 2023-2027 ===
Thatcham North East, 24 April 2025
Party	Candidate	Votes	%	±%
Liberal Democrats	Tom McCann	690	41.1	
Conservative	Dominic Parry	428	25.5	
Reform	James Stokes	367	21.9	
Green	Michael Wakelyn-Green	127	7.6	
Labour	Lee Allen	65	3.9	
Majority		262	15.6	
Turnout		1,677		
Liberal Democrats hold		Swing		
