= 2023 West Berkshire Council election =

Local government election in England

- 4 May 2023

All 43 seats to West Berkshire Council 22 seats needed for a majority
- Turnout: 38%

	First party	Second party
Leader	Lee Dillon	Lynne Doherty
Party	Liberal Democrats	Conservative
Leader's seat	Thatcham North East	Newbury Speen (defeated)
Last election	16 seats, 31.9%	24 seats, 37.4%
Seats won	29	11
Seat change	▲13	▼13
Popular vote	22,063	16,074
Percentage	42.8%	31.2%
Swing	▲10.9%	▼6.2%
	Third party	Fourth party
Leader	Carolyne Culver
Party	Green	Labour
Leader's seat	Ridgeway
Last election	3 seats, 19.3%	0 seats, 9.7%
Seats won	2	1
Seat change	▼1	▲1
Popular vote	8,692	3,639
Percentage	16.9%	7.1%
Swing	▼2.5%	▼2.7%
Leader before election
Lynne Doherty
Conservative
Leader after election
Lee Dillon
Liberal Democrats

The 2023 West Berkshire Council election took take place on 4 May 2023 to elect members of West Berkshire Council in England. This was on the same day as other local elections across England.

Prior to the election the council was under Conservative control, with the party having held a majority of the seats since 2005. The Liberal Democrats took control at the election, winning 29 of the 43 seats. The Conservative leader of the council, Lynne Doherty, lost her seat. At the subsequent annual council meeting on 25 May 2023, Liberal Democrat leader Lee Dillon was appointed leader of the council. The Conservatives appointed Ross Mackinnon to be their new leader in opposition.

== Councillors standing down ==
Councillor	Ward	First elected	Party
Jeff Beck	Newbury Clay Hill	2000	Conservative
Jeff Cant	Newbury Clay Hill	2019	Conservative
Hilary Cole	Chieveley and Cold Ash	2007	Conservative
James Cole	Hungerford and Kintbury	2015	Conservative
Nassar Hunt	Thatcham Central	2019	Liberal Democrats
Gareth Hurley	Pangbourne	2019	Conservative
Rick Jones	Tilehurst and Purley	2015	Conservative
Alan Law	Basildon	2007	Conservative
Royce Longton	Burghfield and Mortimer	1993	Liberal Democrats
Graham Pask	Bucklebury	1987	Conservative
Claire Rowles	Hungerford and Kintbury	2019	Conservative
Garth Simpson	Chieveley and Cold Ash	2011	Conservative
Andrew Williamson	Tilehurst and Purley	2019	Conservative
Keith Woodhams	Thatcham West	1997	Liberal Democrats

== Results summary ==
The Liberal Democrats gained a majority on West Berkshire council for the first time since 2003, beating the Conservative Party.

This election saw the Labour Party win a seat on the council for the first time since its formation.

=== Election result ===
2023 West Berkshire Council election
Party	Candidates	Seats	Gains	Losses	Net gain/loss	Seats %	Votes %	Votes	+/−
Liberal Democrats	43	29	13	0	▲13	67.4	42.8	22,063	+10.9
Conservative	43	11	0	13	▼13	25.6	31.2	16,074	−6.2
Green	18	2	0	1	▼1	4.7	16.9	8,692	−2.5
Labour	15	1	1	0	▲1	2.3	7.1	3,639	−2.7
Reform	2	0	0	0	Steady	0.0	0.4	222	New
UKIP	1	0	0	0	Steady	0.0	0.2	89	−1.5
Heritage	1	0	0	0	Steady	0.0	0.2	86	New
Independent	2	0	0	0	Steady	0.0	1.3	696	New

== Ward results ==
The Statement of Persons Nominated, which details the candidates standing in each ward, was released by West Berkshire Council following the close of nominations on 5 April 2023.

Winning candidates are highlighted in bold.

=== Aldermaston ===
Aldermaston
Party	Candidate	Votes	%	±%
**Conservative**	**Dominic Boeck**	**562**	**51.0**	**−4.1**
Liberal Democrats	Zdena Burne	333	30.2	−2.9
Labour	Philippa Heath	128	11.6	−0.2
Green	Matthew Lowe	80	7.3	New
Majority		229	20.8	−1.2
Turnout		1,108	36.8	
Registered electors		3,010		
Rejected ballots		5	0.5	
Conservative **hold**		Swing	−3.5	

=== Basildon ===
Basildon
Party	Candidate	Votes	%	±%
**Liberal Democrats**	**Laura Coyle**	**727**	**58.6**	**+34.7**
Conservative	Hazel Preston-Barnes	513	41.4	−14.2
Majority		214	17.3	N/A
Turnout		1,249	45.3	
Registered electors		2,758		
Rejected ballots		9	0.7	
Liberal Democrats **gain** from Conservative		Swing	+24.5	

=== Bradfield ===
Bradfield
Party	Candidate	Votes	%	±%
**Conservative**	**Ross Mackinnon**	**601**	**57.2**	**−5.1**
Liberal Democrats	Richard Bucknall	357	34.0	+6.8
Labour	Michael Woodward	93	8.8	−1.8
Majority		244	23.2	−11.9
Turnout		1,054	36.3	
Registered electors		2,905		
Rejected ballots		3	0.3	
Conservative **hold**		Swing	−5.9	

=== Bucklebury ===
Bucklebury
Party	Candidate	Votes	%	±%
**Liberal Democrats**	**Chris Read**	**828**	**54.7**	**+35.0**
Conservative	Georgina Woods	521	34.4	−28.1
Green	Graham Loader	164	10.8	−3.0
Majority		307	20.3	N/A
Turnout		1,519	52.8	
Registered electors		2,879		
Rejected ballots		6	0.4	
Liberal Democrats **gain** from Conservative		Swing	+31.5	

=== Burghfield and Mortimer ===
Burghfield and Mortimer (3 seats)
Party	Candidate	Votes	%	±%
**Liberal Democrats**	**Nick Carter**	**1,499**	**49.2**	**+4.1**
**Liberal Democrats**	**Vicky Poole**	**1,438**	**47.2**	**N/A**
**Liberal Democrats**	**Geoff Mayes**	**1,330**	**43.6**	**+2.7**
Conservative	Graham Bridgman	1,146	37.6	−2.4
Conservative	Dave Kilshaw	1,055	34.6	−4.6
Conservative	Amanda Mackinnon	1,032	33.9	−1.9
Labour	Sarah Timms	450	14.8	−4.6
Green	Peter Gower	434	14.2	−16.5
Labour	Christian Savill	306	10.0	−1.0
Turnout		3,058	38.0	
Registered electors		8,055		
Rejected ballots		11	0.4	
Liberal Democrats **hold**				
Liberal Democrats **hold**				
Liberal Democrats **gain** from Conservative				

=== Chieveley and Cold Ash ===
Chieveley and Cold Ash (2 seats)
Party	Candidate	Votes	%	±%
**Liberal Democrats**	**Heather Codling**	**1,156**	**47.6**	**+21.5**
**Conservative**	**Paul Dick**	**1,049**	**43.2**	**−9.6**
Conservative	Pip Witheridge	878	36.1	−13.1
Liberal Democrats	Tom McCann	829	34.1	N/A
Green	Jill Hoblin	585	24.1	−4.0
Turnout		2,440	44.9	
Registered electors		5,431		
Rejected ballots		10	0.4	
Liberal Democrats **gain** from Conservative				
Conservative **hold**				

=== Downlands ===
Downlands
Party	Candidate	Votes	%	±%
**Conservative**	**Clive Hooker**	**644**	**55.6**	**−6.6**
Liberal Democrats	John Boyd	288	24.8	−3.0
Green	Jane Gartshore	146	12.6	New
Labour	Ian McKay	81	7.0	−3.0
Majority		356	30.7	−3.7
Turnout		1,167	38.9	
Registered electors		2,999		
Rejected ballots		7	0.6	
Conservative **hold**		Swing	−4.8	

=== Hungerford and Kintbury ===
Hungerford and Kintbury (3 seats)
Party	Candidate	Votes	%	±%
**Liberal Democrats**	**Denise Gaines**	**2,036**	**54.7**	**+15.1**
**Liberal Democrats**	**Tony Vickers**	**1,704**	**45.8**	**+8.6**
**Conservative**	**Dennis Benneyworth**	**1,572**	**42.2**	**−6.3**
Liberal Democrats	Julian Swift-Hook	1,509	40.5	+10.8
Conservative	Peter Tompkins	1,380	37.1	−8.6
Conservative	Ben Podger	1,356	36.4	−7.6
Green	Trish Whitham	829	22.3	+1.4
Turnout		3,738	42.1	
Registered electors		8,882		
Rejected ballots		15	0.4	
Liberal Democrats **gain** from Conservative				
Liberal Democrats **gain** from Conservative				
Conservative **hold**				

=== Lambourn ===
Lambourn
Party	Candidate	Votes	%	±%
**Conservative**	**Howard Woollaston**	**618**	**59.8**	**−3.3**
Liberal Democrats	Diana Pattenden	262	25.4	+1.4
Green	Susan Millington	153	14.8	New
Majority		356	34.5	−4.6
Turnout		1,037	33.4	
Registered electors		3,103		
Rejected ballots		2	0.2	
Conservative **hold**		Swing	−2.3	

=== Newbury Central ===
Newbury Central (2 seats)
Party	Candidate	Votes	%	±%
**Liberal Democrats**	**Martin Colston**	**1,358**	**60.0**	**+11.4**
**Liberal Democrats**	**Louise Sturgess**	**1,316**	**58.2**	**+10.7**
Conservative	Sean Doherty	650	28.7	+0.8
Conservative	JC Jardim	619	27.4	+0.8
Green	Bobby Pop	399	17.6	−4.7
Turnout		2,272	41.1	
Registered electors		5,526		
Rejected ballots		10	0.4	
Liberal Democrats **hold**				
Liberal Democrats **hold**				

=== Newbury Clay Hill ===
Newbury Clay Hill (2 seats)
Party	Candidate	Votes	%	±%
**Liberal Democrats**	**Stuart Gourley**	**1,311**	**69.4**	**+33.5**
**Liberal Democrats**	**Nigel Foot**	**1,077**	**57.0**	**+32.5**
Conservative	Richard Almond	432	22.9	−20.8
Conservative	Jeanette Clifford	422	22.3	−14.5
Independent	John Gotelee	263	13.9	N/A
Green	Karen Swaffield	242	12.8	−9.1
Heritage	David McMahon	86	4.6	N/A
Turnout		1,896	33.9	
Registered electors		5,596		
Rejected ballots		7	0.4	
Liberal Democrats **gain** from Conservative				
Liberal Democrats **gain** from Conservative				

=== Newbury Greenham ===
Newbury Greenham (3 seats)
Party	Candidate	Votes	%	±%
**Liberal Democrats**	**Phil Barnett**	**1,716**	**55.5**	**+7.0**
**Liberal Democrats**	**Billy Drummond**	**1,532**	**49.6**	**−0.2**
**Liberal Democrats**	**Erik Pattenden**	**1,484**	**48.0**	**+6.3**
Green	Michael Wakelyn-Green	918	29.7	+9.1
Conservative	Sarah James	754	24.4	−2.9
Conservative	Linda Verner	725	23.5	−3.7
Conservative	Joseph Clarke	713	23.1	−2.1
Labour	Gary Puffett	426	13.8	+4.3
Reform	James Anfield	143	4.6	N/A
Turnout		3,100	33.8	
Registered electors		9,180		
Rejected ballots		10	0.3	
Liberal Democrats **hold**				
Liberal Democrats **hold**				
Liberal Democrats **hold**				

=== Newbury Speen ===
Newbury Speen (2 seats)
Party	Candidate	Votes	%	±%
**Liberal Democrats**	**Martha Vickers**	**1,109**	**44.8**	**+11.5**
**Liberal Democrats**	**Antony Amirtharaj**	**1,062**	**42.9**	**N/A**
Green	Steve Masters	831	33.5	−23.2
Conservative	Lynne Doherty	791	31.9	−3.5
Conservative	David Dudman	748	30.2	−4.6
Reform	Jose Ferreira	79	3.2	N/A
Turnout		2,487	43.1	
Registered electors		5,766		
Rejected ballots		10	0.4	
Liberal Democrats **gain** from Green				
Liberal Democrats **gain** from Conservative				

=== Newbury Wash Common ===
Newbury Wash Common (3 seats)
Party	Candidate	Votes	%	±%
**Liberal Democrats**	**Patrick Clark**	**1,774**	**54.0**	**−0.5**
**Liberal Democrats**	**Adrian Abbs**	**1,712**	**52.1**	**−2.4**
**Green**	**David Marsh**	**1,495**	**45.5**	**−8.0**
Liberal Democrats	Vaughan Miller	1,480	45.0	N/A
Conservative	James Davies	686	20.9	−12.4
Conservative	Clive Hunt	676	20.6	−6.7
Conservative	Andrea Stephenson	627	19.1	−6.0
Independent	Simon Kirby	433	13.2	N/A
Turnout		3,305	46.5	
Registered electors		7,103		
Rejected ballots		19	0.6	
Liberal Democrats **hold**				
Liberal Democrats **hold**				
Green **hold**				

=== Pangbourne ===
Pangbourne
Party	Candidate	Votes	%	±%
**Liberal Democrats**	**Matthew Shakespeare**	**678**	**53.1**	**+22.6**
Conservative	Michael Male	444	34.8	−16.9
Labour	Mark Farrington	94	7.4	−10.5
Green	Tim Hall	61	4.8	New
Majority		234	18.3	N/A
Turnout		1,282	45.9	
Registered electors		2,791		
Rejected ballots		5	0.4	
Liberal Democrats **gain** from Conservative		Swing	+19.8	

=== Ridgeway ===
Ridgeway
Party	Candidate	Votes	%	±%
**Green**	**Carolyne Culver**	**952**	**68.8**	**+6.9**
Conservative	Edward Iliffe	345	24.9	−6.0
Liberal Democrats	Pam Lusby Taylor	87	6.3	New
Majority		607	43.9	+12.9
Turnout		1,387	45.1	
Registered electors		3,075		
Rejected ballots		3	0.2	
Green **hold**		Swing	+6.4	

=== Thatcham Central ===
Thatcham Central (2 seats)
Party	Candidate	Votes	%	±%
**Liberal Democrats**	**Stephanie Steevenson**	**1,040**	**56.5**	**+9.3**
**Liberal Democrats**	**Iain Cottingham**	**1,024**	**55.6**	**+15.7**
Conservative	Richard Crumly	511	27.8	−3.6
Conservative	Iain Murphy	482	26.2	−0.6
Green	Estella Collins	267	14.5	−0.5
Labour	Mike Brook	196	10.6	+3.9
Turnout		1,858	34.4	
Registered electors		5,396		
Rejected ballots		17	0.9	
Liberal Democrats **hold**				
Liberal Democrats **hold**				

=== Thatcham Colthrop and Crookham ===
Thatcham Colthrop and Crookham
Party	Candidate	Votes	%	±%
**Liberal Democrats**	**Owen Jeffery**	**794**	**70.1**	**+27.7**
Conservative	Steve Ardagh-Walter	339	29.9	−19.9
Majority		455	40.2	N/A
Turnout		1,145	44.4	
Registered electors		2,576		
Rejected ballots		12	1.0	
Liberal Democrats **gain** from Conservative		Swing	+23.8	

=== Thatcham North East ===
Thatcham North East (2 seats)
Party	Candidate	Votes	%	±%
**Liberal Democrats**	**Lee Dillon**	**1,131**	**61.4**	**+6.1**
**Liberal Democrats**	**Jeremy Cottam**	**1,048**	**56.9**	**+3.4**
Conservative	Simon Carr	514	27.9	−8.0
Conservative	Dominic Parry	432	23.5	−8.1
Green	Kath Hodgson	376	20.4	N/A
Turnout		1,849	32.0	
Registered electors		5,780		
Rejected ballots		8	0.4	
Liberal Democrats **hold**				
Liberal Democrats **hold**				

=== Thatcham West ===
Thatcham West (2 seats)
Party	Candidate	Votes	%	±%
**Liberal Democrats**	**Jeff Brooks**	**1,100**	**63.2**	**+13.6**
**Liberal Democrats**	**Justin Pemberton**	**871**	**50.3**	**+4.7**
Conservative	Jason Collis	439	25.4	−1.2
Conservative	Jonathan Pearson	344	19.9	−3.7
Green	Elizabeth Parsloe	215	12.4	−2.0
Labour	Sarah Berrington	121	7.0	+0.9
Labour	Nick East	99	5.7	+1.1
UKIP	Gary Johnson	89	5.1	−9.3
Turnout		1,741	32.4	
Registered electors		5,367		
Rejected ballots		10	0.6	
Liberal Democrats **hold**				
Liberal Democrats **hold**				

=== Theale ===
Theale
Party	Candidate	Votes	%	±%
**Liberal Democrats**	**Alan Macro**	**585**	**70.7**	**+3.1**
Conservative	Thomas Parkhill	148	17.9	−4.9
Labour	Suzie Ferguson	94	11.4	+1.8
Majority		437	52.8	+8.0
Turnout		2,307	36.0	
Registered electors		2,307		
Rejected ballots		3	0.4	
Liberal Democrats **hold**		Swing	+4.0	

=== Tilehurst and Purley ===
Tilehurst and Purley (3 seats)
Party	Candidate	Votes	%	±%
**Liberal Democrats**	**Janine Lewis**	**1,195**	**42.4**	**+22.1**
**Conservative**	**Jane Langford**	**1,191**	**42.2**	**−10.4**
**Conservative**	**Paul Kander**	**1,183**	**41.9**	**−9.1**
Liberal Democrats	Simon Billows	1,133	40.2	N/A
Conservative	Thomas Marino	1,097	38.9	−10.0
Liberal Democrats	Gary Norman	633	22.4	N/A
Labour	James Warren	599	21.2	−3.5
Green	Jacqueline Paynter	545	19.3	−6.7
Turnout		2,831	34.4	
Registered electors		8,226		
Rejected ballots		10	0.4	
Liberal Democrats **gain** from Conservative				
Conservative **hold**				
Conservative **hold**				

=== Tilehurst Birch Copse ===
Tilehurst Birch Copse (2 seats)
Party	Candidate	Votes	%	±%
**Conservative**	**Jo Stewart**	**777**	**45.3**	**−3.5**
**Labour**	**Clive Taylor**	**737**	**42.9**	**+18.8**
Conservative	Tony Linden	736	42.9	−5.6
Liberal Democrats	Ceinwen Lally	438	25.5	+11.8
Liberal Democrats	Andy Moore	345	20.1	+8.5
Turnout		1,719	28.9	
Registered electors		5,939		
Rejected ballots		2	0.1	
Conservative **hold**				
Labour **gain** from Conservative				

=== Tilehurst South and Holybrook ===
Tilehurst South and Holybrook (2 seats)
Party	Candidate	Votes	%	±%
**Conservative**	**Richard Somner**	**827**	**49.8**	**−8.4**
**Conservative**	**Biyi Oloko**	**716**	**43.1**	**−12.2**
Labour	Charles Croal	620	37.3	+12.0
Labour	Liz Bell	554	33.4	+9.9
Liberal Democrats	Andre Browne	261	15.7	−1.3
Liberal Democrats	John Grout	203	12.2	−1.0
Turnout		1,673	29.2	
Registered electors		5,725		
Rejected ballots		12	0.7	
Conservative **hold**				
Conservative **hold**				

== Changes 2023–2027 ==
- Newbury Wash Common councillor Adrian Abbs resigned from the Liberal Democrats on 27 October 2023 to sit as an independent, after being disqualified from the party's selection contest for the new Reading West and Mid Berkshire constituency.

=== By-elections ===
==== Thatcham North East ====
The by-election was triggered by the resignation of council leader Lee Dillon, who stood down as a councillor to focus on his role as MP for Newbury after his election in July 2024.

Thatcham North East by-election: 1 May 2025
Party	Candidate	Votes	%	±%
Liberal Democrats	Tom McCann	690	41.1	–14.9
Conservative	Dominic Parry	428	25.5	+0.1
Reform	James Stokes	367	21.9	N/A
Green	Michael Wakelyn-Green	127	7.6	–11.0
Labour	Lee Allen	65	3.9	N/A
Majority		262	15.6	N/A
Turnout		1,679	29.1	–2.9
Liberal Democrats hold		Swing	▼7.5	
