= Alex Davies-Jones =

Welsh politician (born 1989)

Alex Davies-Jones MP
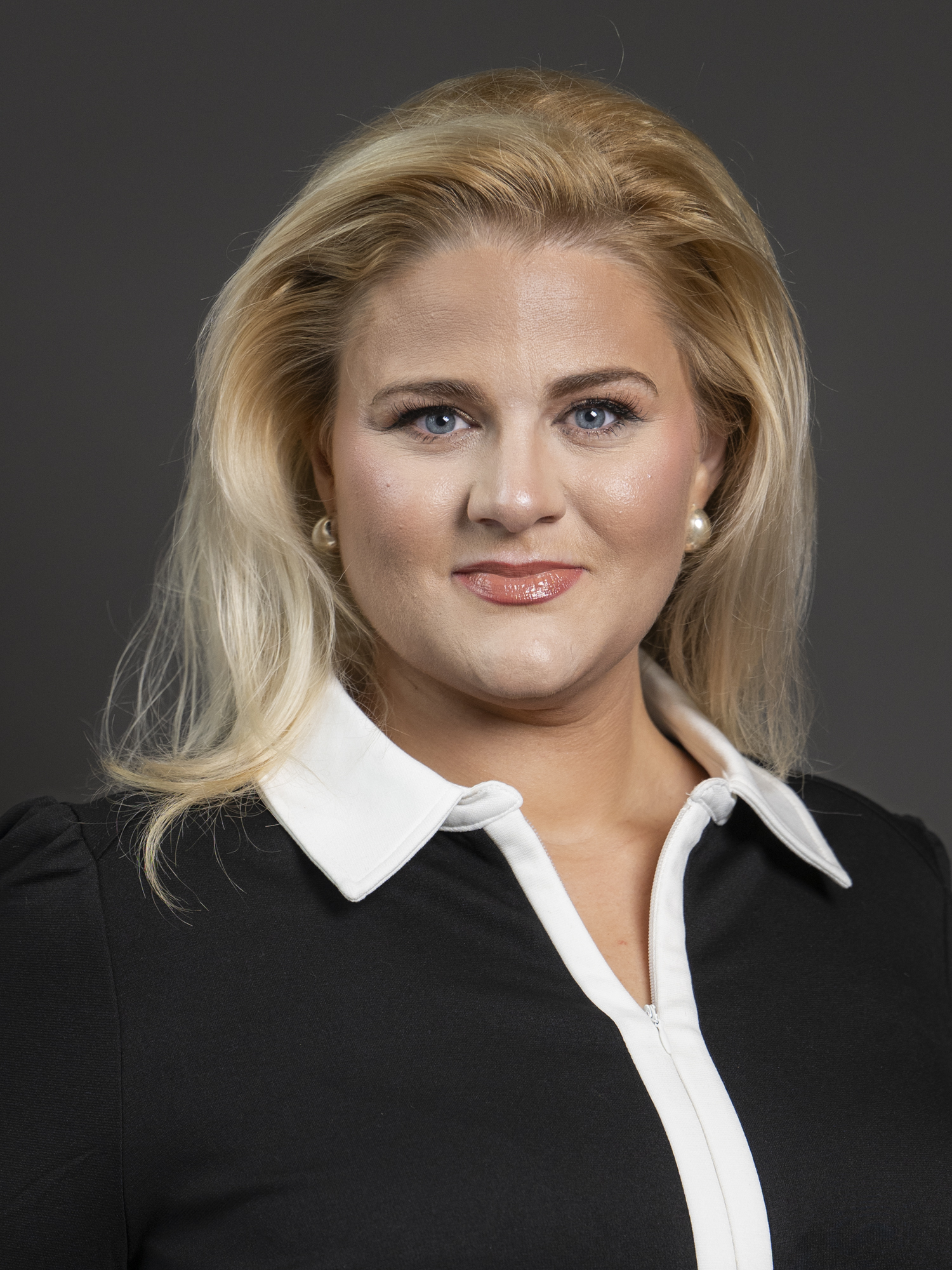
- Official portrait, 2024

Parliamentary Under-Secretary of State for Victims, Violence Against Women and Girls and International Justice (Note: Parliamentary Under-Secretary of State for Victims and Tackling Violence Against Women and Girls 2024 to 2026)
- Incumbent
- Assumed office 22 July 2026
- Prime Minister: Andy Burnham
- Preceded by: Catherine Atkinson
- In office 9 July 2024 – 12 May 2026
- Prime Minister: Keir Starmer
- Preceded by: Laura Farris
- Succeeded by: Catherine Atkinson
Shadow portfolios
Shadow Minister for Domestic Violence and Safeguarding
In office 27 November 2023 – 5 July 2024
Leader	Keir Starmer
Preceded by	Jess Phillips
Succeeded by	Office abolished
Shadow Minister for Tech and Digital Economy (Note: Shadow Minister for Tech, Gambling and Digital Economy (2021–23). Stephanie Peacock assumed responsibilities for Gambling.)
In office 4 December 2021 – 27 November 2023
Leader	Keir Starmer
Preceded by	Office established
Succeeded by	Chris Evans
Shadow Minister for Northern Ireland
In office 26 February 2021 – 4 December 2021
Leader	Keir Starmer
Preceded by	Karin Smyth
Succeeded by	Tonia Antoniazzi

Member of Parliament for Pontypridd
- Incumbent
- Assumed office 12 December 2019
- Preceded by: Owen Smith
- Majority: 8,402 (21.3%)

Personal details
- Born: Alexandra Davies-Jones; 5 April 1989 (age 37) Church Village, Wales
- Party: Labour
- Spouse: Andrew Davies-Jones (m. 2014)
- Children: 3
- Education: Tonyrefail School; Cardiff University (LLB)
- Website: www.alexdaviesjones.com

Alexandra Davies-Jones (born 5 April 1989) is a Welsh Labour Party politician who has been the Member of Parliament (MP) for Pontypridd since 2019. She has served as Parliamentary Under-Secretary of State for Victims and Tackling Violence Against Women and Girls from 2024, with a brief spell on the backbenches from May to July 2026.

== Early life and education ==
Alexandra Davies was born on 5 April 1989 in Church Village. She is the daughter of a miner, stating that she was "brought up on the values of socialism". She attended Tonyrefail Primary School, Tonyrefail Comprehensive School and graduated from Cardiff University with a joint honours degree in law and politics.

== Political career ==
Davies-Jones was a youth representative for the Labour Party, Co-operative Party, and the trade union Unite the Union.

She began her career as a researcher in the House of Commons and the National Assembly for Wales. Davies-Jones was a Regional Development Consultant for the Electoral Reform Society from 2010 to 2011. She then worked as a communications and press officer for Wales and the West Midlands at the Royal Institute of Chartered Surveyors from 2013 to 2015. She worked for the non-profit Dwr Cymru Welsh Water as a regional communications director and then a community engagement manager from 2015 to 2019.

Davies-Jones was elected as a community councillor for Tonyrefail and District Community Council in 2012, at the age of 23, sitting alongside her father and husband who both were community councillors. In 2017 she was elected as a county councillor for the ward of Tonyrefail West on Rhondda Cynon Taf Council.

Following Owen Smith's announcement that he would not seek re-election, Davies-Jones was selected as the Labour candidate for Pontypridd in 2019.

== Parliamentary career ==
=== In opposition (2019–2024) ===
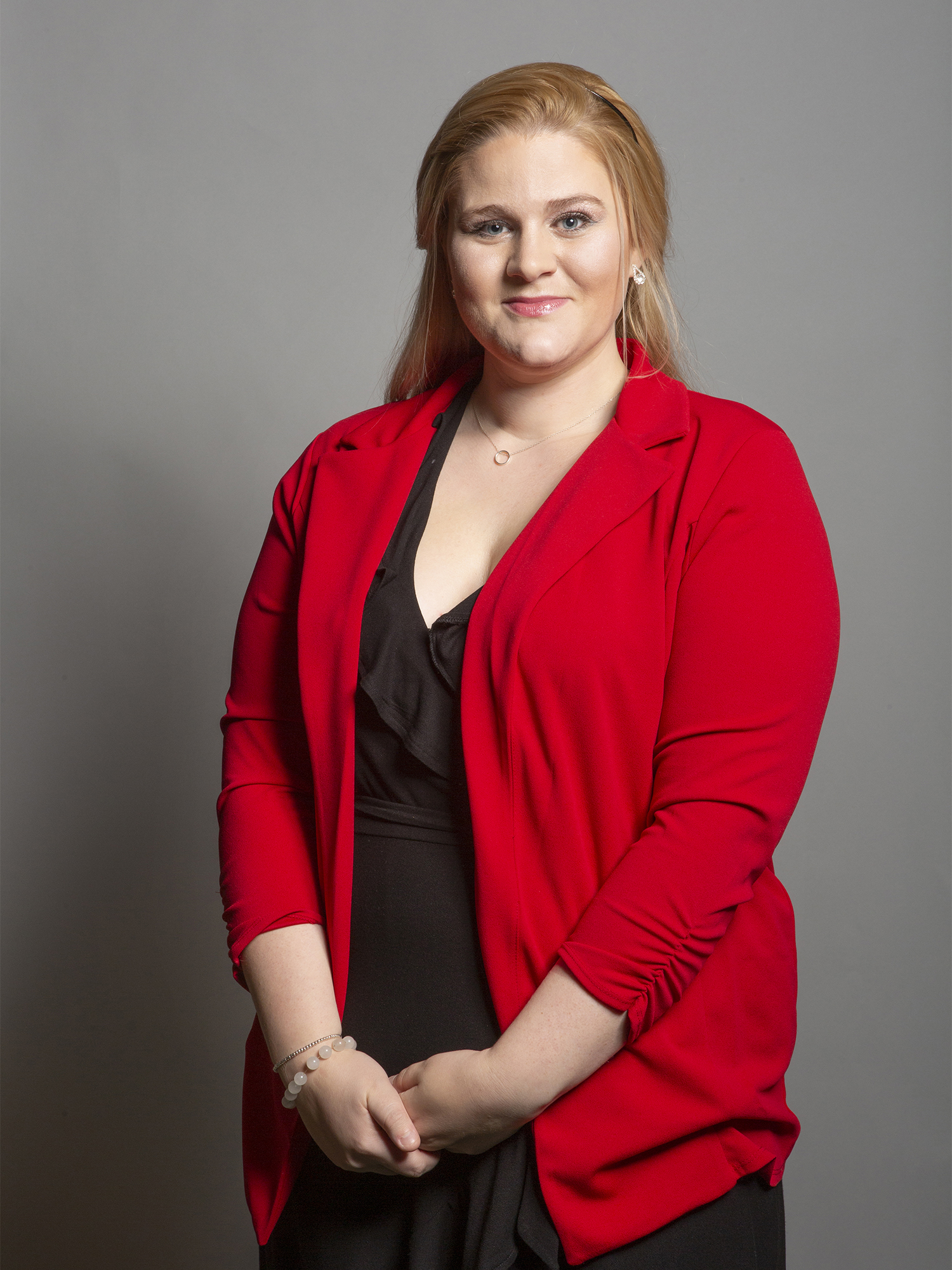
Official portrait, 2019

At the 2019 general election, Davies-Jones was elected to Parliament as MP for Pontypridd with 44.5% of the vote and a majority of 5,890.

During her time in opposition, Davies-Jones held several shadow ministerial positions. She served as Shadow Minister for Northern Ireland from February 2021 to December 2021, before becoming Shadow Minister for Tech, Gambling and Digital Economy from December 2021 to November 2023.

In this role, she led Labour's legislative scrutiny of the Online Safety Act in the House of Commons, working with MPs across the House on issues such as online violence against women and girls.

From November 2023 to July 2024, Davies-Jones served as Shadow Minister for Domestic Violence and Safeguarding. She served as Chair of the All Party Parliamentary Group on Domestic Abuse and Vice Chair of the All Party Parliamentary Group on Music Education.

=== In government (2024–2026) ===
At the 2024 general election, Davies-Jones was re-elected as MP for Pontypridd with a decreased vote share of 41.2% and an increased majority of 8,402.

Following Labour's victory in the 2024 general election, Davies-Jones was appointed to government as Parliamentary Under-Secretary of State for Victims in the Ministry of Justice on 9 July 2024, serving under Prime Minister Keir Starmer.

As a government minister, Davies-Jones has consistently supported Labour's legislative agenda whilst maintaining perfect party loyalty. In November 2024, she voted in favour of the Terminally Ill Adults (End of Life) Bill on 29 November 2024, which proposes to legalise assisted dying.

Davies-Jones resigned from the government on 12 May 2026, calling on Keir Starmer to set out a timetable for his resignation.

== Controversies and investigations ==
=== Declared interests ===
According to her register of interests as of September 2024, Davies-Jones declared gifts totalling £1,158, including £700 from the gambling industry and £458 from the telecommunications sector. She also declared donations totalling £23,000, comprising £10,000 from a private individual and £13,000 from trade unions. The gambling industry gift was received during her tenure as Shadow Minister for Tech, Gambling and Digital Economy, a role that included oversight of gambling policy.

=== Lobbying rules breach ===
In February 2023, following an investigation by the Parliamentary Commissioner for Standards, Davies-Jones was found to have breached the Code of Conduct for Members in relation to asking a parliamentary question about the British Council. She had taken part in a British Council funded trip to Japan the previous autumn. Davies-Jones apologised and following the report's determination that the breach was "minor and inadvertent", the Commons Select Committee on Standards took no further action.

=== Israel-Palestine ===
Davies-Jones is a parliamentary supporter of Labour Friends of Israel and was part of a delegation to the country in February 2023. Her Parliamentary record in respect to Israel includes abstaining on a vote for a ceasefire in Gaza, as well as forgoing signing an open letter calling for the suspension of arms sales to Israel in March 2024. Her support of Israel has faced protest from Rhondda Cynon Taf Palestine Solidarity Campaign in light of the Gaza genocide, especially with statements in October 2023 from Israeli President Isaac Herzog being flagged at the International Court of Justice as using genocidal language.

During the run up to the 2024 United Kingdom general election Davies-Jones pulled out of a hustings event held by Rhondda Cynon Taf Palestine Solidarity Campaign and the National Education Union. She told the organisers she could no longer participate as a result of threats from another candidate, and was acting on police advice not to attend the event. The hustings event was cancelled.

On 29 June 2024, two constituents were arrested after Davies-Jones filed a complaint of "intimidation" in response to an online video of them asking her why she had abstained on a SNP motion for a ceasefire in Gaza. According to a statement by the South Wales Police, "Two women, aged 25 and 30, have been arrested on suspicion of harassment, public order offences and criminal damage in the Pontypridd area". The two had their homes raided and were given bail conditions restricting their ability to talk about the arrests on social media. The pair were initially found guilty of harassment in June 2025, but had their convictions overturned in November of that year.

=== Threats following Andrew Tate comments ===
Davies-Jones spoke publicly about threats she received in January 2023 after she raised the issue of Andrew Tate's influence over school behaviour in boys. Raising the issue initially at prime minister's questions, she told MPs "Teachers are now having to develop their own resources to re-educate boys who are being brainwashed online by his deeply toxic messaging." Davies-Jones involved the police after she received death threats and rape threats.

== Personal life ==
Davies-Jones has two stepsons, and a son, with her husband Andrew, whom she married in 2014. Her husband Andrew served as a community councillor alongside her and her father on Tonyrefail and District Community Council.

In March 2020, Davies-Jones delivered a personal speech to the House of Commons on International Women's Day, sharing her experiences with IVF treatment. She spoke about the "guilt" she felt for being unable to conceive naturally and described her son Sulley as her "one in a million", born after one round of IVF treatment. Davies-Jones revealed that Sulley was born prematurely and spent his first two weeks in the neonatal intensive care unit, which she described as "the most difficult weeks of my life".

In January 2021, Davies-Jones talked to BBC News about her experiences of cervical cancer.
