= 2019 West Berkshire Council election =

Local government election in England

- 2 May 2019

All 43 seats to West Berkshire Council 22 seats needed for a majority

	First party	Second party	Third party
Party	Conservative	Liberal Democrats	Green
Last election	48 seats, 58.3%	4 seats, 25.3%	0 seats, 3.0%
Seats won	24	16	3
Seat change	▼24	▲12	▲3
Popular vote	18,358	15,657	9,497
Percentage	37.4%	31.9%	19.3%
- Winner of each seat at the 2019 West Berkshire Council election
Council control before election
Conservative
Council control after election
Conservative

The 2019 West Berkshire Council election took place on 2 May 2019 to elect members of West Berkshire Council in England. This was on the same day as other local elections. The whole council was up for election and the Conservative Party retained overall control of the council, despite significant gains by the Liberal Democrats and the election of the first Green Party councillors in West Berkshire.

== Background ==
At the last election in 2015, the Conservatives won a majority of seats, with 48 councillors, compared to 4 for the Liberal Democrats. No other parties had representation on the council.

There were boundary changes between the 2015 and 2019 elections, reducing the total number of seats from 52 to 43, and the number of wards from 30 to 24. The new wards elected between one and three district councillors depending on their population.

== Summary ==
=== Election result ===
2019 West Berkshire Council election
Party	Candidates	Seats	Gains	Losses	Net gain/loss	Seats %	Votes %	Votes	+/−
Conservative	43	24	N/A	N/A	▼24	55.8	37.4	18,258	
Liberal Democrats	36	16	N/A	N/A	▲12	37.2	31.9	15,657	
Green	16	3	N/A	N/A	▲3	7.0	19.3	9,497	
Labour	43	0	N/A	N/A	Steady	0.0	9.7	4,767	
UKIP	4	0	N/A	N/A	Steady	0.0	1.7	816	

== Ward results ==
Winning candidates are highlighted in bold.

=== Aldermaston ===
Aldermaston (1 seat)
Party	Candidate	Votes	%
**Conservative**	**Dominic Kevin Boeck**	**529**	**55.1**
Liberal Democrats	Peter Greenhalgh	318	33.1
Labour	David Hancock	113	11.8
Majority		211	22.0
Turnout		983	33%
Registered electors		3,010	
Rejected ballots		23	2.3
Conservative **win** (new seat)			

=== Basildon ===
Basildon (1 seat)
Party	Candidate	Votes	%
**Conservative**	**Alan Law**	**595**	**55.6**
Liberal Democrats	Laura Coyle	256	23.9
Green	Alex Carter	156	14.6
Labour	Jonathan Ashley	64	6.0
Majority		339	31.7
Turnout		1,087	38%
Registered electors		2,835	
Rejected ballots		16	1.5
Conservative **win** (new seat)			

=== Bradfield ===
Bradfield (1 seat)
Party	Candidate	Votes	%
**Conservative**	**Ross MacKinnon**	**543**	**62.3**
Liberal Democrats	Ian Park	237	27.2
Labour	Ian McKay	92	10.6
Majority		306	35.1
Turnout		947	33%
Registered electors		2,873	
Rejected ballots		31	3.3
Conservative **win** (new seat)			

=== Bucklebury ===
Bucklebury (1 seat)
Party	Candidate	Votes	%
**Conservative**	**Graham Pask**	**745**	**62.5**
Liberal Democrats	Mike Cole	235	19.7
Green	Jacqueline Paynter	164	13.8
Labour	Frank Greenwood	48	4.0
Majority		510	42.8
Turnout		1,212	43%
Registered electors		2,839	
Rejected ballots		20	1.7
Conservative **win** (new seat)			

=== Burghfield and Mortimer ===
Burghfield and Mortimer (3 seats)
Party	Candidate	Votes	%
**Liberal Democrats**	**Royce Longton**	**1,293**	**45.1**
**Liberal Democrats**	**Geoffrey Mayes**	**1,173**	**40.9**
**Conservative**	**Graham Bridgman**	**1,148**	**40.0**
Conservative	Carol Jackson-Doerge	1,126	39.2
Conservative	Ian Morrin	1,028	35.8
Green	Alison May	880	30.7
Labour	John Hannawin	556	19.4
Labour	Janet Bishop	315	11.0
Labour	Graham Hudson	246	8.5
Majority		22	0.8
Turnout		2,908	36%
Registered electors		8,190	
Rejected ballots		38	1.3
Liberal Democrats **win** (new seat)			
Liberal Democrats **win** (new seat)			
Conservative **win** (new seat)			

=== Chieveley and Cold Ash ===
Chieveley and Cold Ash (2 seats)
Party	Candidate	Votes	%
**Conservative**	**Hilary Cole**	**1,073**	**52.8**
**Conservative**	**Garth Simpson**	**1,000**	**49.2**
Green	Jill Hoblin	572	28.1
Liberal Democrats	David Lister	530	26.1
Green	James Thomas	377	18.5
Labour	Marc Charon	103	5.1
Labour	Chris Evans	93	4.6
Majority		428	21.1
Turnout		2,073	38%
Registered electors		5,415	
Rejected ballots		40	1.9
Conservative **win** (new seat)			
Conservative **win** (new seat)			

=== Downlands ===
Downlands (1 seat)
Party	Candidate	Votes	%
**Conservative**	**Clive Hooker**	**716**	**62.2**
Liberal Democrats	Martin Colston	320	27.8
Labour	Grahame Murphy	115	10.0
Majority		396	34.4
Turnout		1,168	39%
Registered electors		2,980	
Rejected ballots		17	1.5
Conservative **win** (new seat)			

=== Hungerford and Kintbury ===
Hungerford and Kintbury (3 seats)
Party	Candidate	Votes	%
**Conservative**	**Dennis Benneyworth**	**1,772**	**48.5**
**Conservative**	**James Cole**	**1,669**	**45.7**
**Conservative**	**Claire Rowles**	**1,605**	**44.0**
Liberal Democrats	Denise Gaines	1,446	39.6
Liberal Democrats	Rob Chicken	1,359	37.2
Liberal Democrats	Shaun Wood	1,085	29.7
Green	Tim Davis	763	20.9
Labour	Paul Pugh	154	4.2
Labour	Ron Blindell	153	4.2
Labour	Matt Wilson	146	4.0
Majority		159	4.4
Turnout		3,695	41%
Registered electors		9,048	
Rejected ballots		45	1.2
Conservative **win** (new seat)			
Conservative **win** (new seat)			
Conservative **win** (new seat)			

=== Lambourn ===
Lambourn (1 seat)
Party	Candidate	Votes	%
**Conservative**	**Howard Woollaston**	**667**	**63.1**
Liberal Democrats	Charlie Christopher	254	24.0
Labour	Moz Reynolds	136	12.9
Majority		413	39.1
Turnout		1,077	33%
Registered electors		3,280	
Rejected ballots		20	1.9
Conservative **win** (new seat)			

=== Newbury Central ===
Newbury Central (2 seats)
Party	Candidate	Votes	%
**Liberal Democrats**	**Martha Vickers**	**979**	**48.6**
**Liberal Democrats**	**Andy Moore**	**957**	**47.5**
Conservative	Anthony Stretton	562	27.9
Conservative	Joseph Clarke	535	26.6
Green	Susan Millington	450	22.3
Labour	Mark Beach	196	9.7
Labour	Caroline Blake	178	8.8
Majority		395	19.6
Turnout		2,040	37%
Registered electors		5,474	
Rejected ballots		25	1.2
Liberal Democrats **win** (new seat)			
Liberal Democrats **win** (new seat)			

=== Newbury Clay Hill ===
Newbury Clay Hill (2 seats)
Party	Candidate	Votes	%
**Conservative**	**Jeff Beck**	**632**	**43.7**
**Conservative**	**Jeff Cant**	**532**	**36.8**
Liberal Democrats	Pam Taylor	519	35.9
Liberal Democrats	Simon Pike	354	24.5
Green	Danielle Bryan	316	21.9
Labour	Gemma Lowe	211	14.6
Labour	Lee McDougall	163	11.3
Majority		13	0.9
Turnout		2,727	27%
Registered electors		5,512	
Rejected ballots		26	1.8
Conservative **win** (new seat)			
Conservative **win** (new seat)			

=== Newbury Greenham ===
Newbury Greenham (3 seats)
Party	Candidate	Votes	%
**Liberal Democrats**	**Billy Drummond**	**1,375**	**49.8**
**Liberal Democrats**	**Phil Barnett**	**1,337**	**48.5**
**Liberal Democrats**	**Erik Pattenden**	**1,151**	**41.7**
Conservative	Sarah Greenall	752	27.3
Conservative	Miles Evans	751	27.2
Conservative	Mark Jones	694	25.2
Green	Matthew Lowe	567	20.6
Labour	Christine Copeland	273	9.9
Labour	Gary Puffett	263	9.5
UKIP	Malik Azam	245	8.9
Labour	Michael Wakelyn-Green	183	6.6
Majority		399	14.4
Turnout		2,782	32%
Registered electors		8,781	
Rejected ballots		23	0.8
Liberal Democrats **win** (new seat)			
Liberal Democrats **win** (new seat)			
Liberal Democrats **win** (new seat)			

=== Newbury Speen ===
Newbury Speen (2 seats)
Party	Candidate	Votes	%
**Green**	**Steve Masters**	**1,324**	**56.7**
**Conservative**	**Lynne Doherty**	**827**	**35.4**
Conservative	Jeanette Clifford	812	34.8
Liberal Democrats	Tony Harris	777	33.3
Labour	Robert Chapman	177	7.6
Labour	Bert Clough	145	6.2
Majority		15	0.6
Turnout		2,352	41%
Registered electors		5,770	
Rejected ballots		18	0.8
Green **win** (new seat)			
Conservative **win** (new seat)			

=== Newbury Wash Common ===
Newbury Wash Common (3 seats)
Party	Candidate	Votes	%
**Liberal Democrats**	**Adrian Abbs**	**1,830**	**54.5**
**Liberal Democrats**	**Tony Vickers**	**1,829**	**54.5**
**Green**	**David Marsh**	**1,794**	**53.5**
Conservative	Adrian Edwards	1,118	33.3
Conservative	Anthony Pick	916	27.3
Conservative	Stuart Davenport	842	25.1
Labour	Julie Wintrup	253	7.5
Labour	Andrew Wallace	168	5.0
Labour	Peter Tullett	167	5.0
Majority		676	20.2
Turnout		3,389	47%
Registered electors		7,225	
Rejected ballots		34	1.0
Liberal Democrats **win** (new seat)			
Liberal Democrats **win** (new seat)			
Green **win** (new seat)			

=== Pangbourne ===
Pangbourne (1 seat)
Party	Candidate	Votes	%
**Conservative**	**Gareth Hurley**	**593**	**51.7**
Liberal Democrats	Matthew Shakespeare	350	30.5
Labour	Suzie Ferguson	205	17.9
Majority		243	21.2
Turnout		1,117	39%
Registered electors		2,878	
Rejected ballots		13	1.2
Conservative **win** (new seat)			

=== Ridgeway ===
Ridgeway (1 seat)
Party	Candidate	Votes	%
**Green**	**Carolyne Culver**	**917**	**61.9**
Conservative	Virginia Celsing	458	30.9
UKIP	Michael Palmer	73	4.9
Labour	Charlotte Blackman	33	2.2
Majority		459	31.0
Turnout		1,483	47%
Registered electors		3,155	
Rejected ballots		2	0.1
Green **win** (new seat)			

=== Thatcham Central ===
Thatcham Central (2 seats)
Party	Candidate	Votes	%
**Liberal Democrats**	**Owen Jeffery**	**907**	**47.2**
**Liberal Democrats**	**Nassar Kessell**	**766**	**39.9**
Conservative	Richard Crumly	603	31.4
Conservative	Marigold Jaques	516	26.8
Green	Paul Field	289	15.0
UKIP	David McMahon	242	12.6
Labour	Dave Burns	129	6.7
Labour	Gary Huntley	121	6.3
Majority		395	19.6
Turnout		1,934	35
Registered electors		5,498	
Rejected ballots		12	0.6
Liberal Democrats **win** (new seat)			
Liberal Democrats **win** (new seat)			

=== Thatcham Colthrop and Crookham ===
Thatcham Colthrop and Crookham (1 seat)
Party	Candidate	Votes	%
**Conservative**	**Steve Ardagh-Walter**	**480**	**49.8**
Liberal Democrats	John Boyd	409	42.4
Labour	James Wilder	75	7.8
Majority		71	7.4
Turnout		986	37%
Registered electors		2,666	
Rejected ballots		22	2.2
Conservative **win** (new seat)			

=== Thatcham North East ===
Thatcham North East (2 seats)
Party	Candidate	Votes	%
**Liberal Democrats**	**Lee Dillon**	**1,088**	**55.3**
**Liberal Democrats**	**Jeremy Cottam**	**1,054**	**53.5**
Conservative	Jason Collis	706	35.9
Conservative	Robert Denton-Powell	622	31.6
Labour	Neale Hall	167	8.5
Labour	Teresa McDowell	156	7.9
Majority		348	17.6
Turnout		2,007	33%
Registered electors		5,998	
Rejected ballots		38	1.9
Liberal Democrats **win** (new seat)			
Liberal Democrats **win** (new seat)			

=== Thatcham West ===
Thatcham West (2 seats)
Party	Candidate	Votes	%
**Liberal Democrats**	**Jeff Brooks**	**885**	**49.9**
**Liberal Democrats**	**Keith Woodhams**	**809**	**45.6**
Conservative	Ellen Crumly	472	26.6
Conservative	Helen Picken	419	23.6
UKIP	Gary Johnson	256	14.4
Green	Jane Livermore	255	14.4
Labour	Sarah Berrington	109	6.1
Labour	Susan Turauskis	82	4.6
Majority		337	19.0
Turnout		1,792	33%
Registered electors		5,487	
Rejected ballots		17	0.9
Liberal Democrats **win** (new seat)			
Liberal Democrats **win** (new seat)			

=== Theale ===
Theale (1 seat)
Party	Candidate	Votes	%
**Liberal Democrats**	**Alan Macro**	**601**	**67.6**
Conservative	Alex Traves	203	22.8
Labour	Chris Ryder	85	9.6
Majority		398	44.8
Turnout		920	39%
Registered electors		2,355	
Rejected ballots		31	3.4
Liberal Democrats **win** (new seat)			

=== Tilehurst and Purley ===
Tilehurst and Purley (3 seats)
Party	Candidate	Votes	%
**Conservative**	**Richard Jones**	**1,419**	**52.6**
**Conservative**	**Andrew Williamson**	**1,375**	**51.0**
**Conservative**	**Thomas Marino**	**1,318**	**48.9**
Green	Steve Young	701	26.0
Labour	Elizabeth Bell	666	24.7
Labour	Ben Rayner	650	24.1
Liberal Democrats	Steve Bown	547	20.3
Labour	Stuart Lythgoe	471	17.5
Majority		617	22.9
Turnout		2,736	33%
Registered electors		8,352	
Rejected ballots		38	1.4
Conservative **win** (new seat)			
Conservative **win** (new seat)			
Conservative **win** (new seat)			

=== Tilehurst Birch Copse ===
Tilehurst Birch Copse (2 seats)
Party	Candidate	Votes	%
**Conservative**	**Joanne Stewart**	**835**	**48.8**
**Conservative**	**Anthony Linden**	**829**	**48.5**
Labour	Clive Taylor	412	24.1
Labour	Louise Coulson	385	22.5
Green	Gary Brampton	349	20.4
Liberal Democrats	Elizabeth O'Keeffe	235	13.7
Liberal Democrats	Gary Norman	198	11.6
Majority		417	24.4
Turnout		1,741	28%
Registered electors		6,184	
Rejected ballots		30	1.7
Conservative **win** (new seat)			
Conservative **win** (new seat)			

=== Tilehurst South and Holybrook ===
Tilehurst South and Holybrook (2 seats)
Party	Candidate	Votes	%
**Conservative**	**Richard Somner**	**910**	**58.2**
**Conservative**	**Peter Argyle**	**865**	**55.3**
Labour	Charles Croal	395	25.3
Labour	Emma Gillespie	367	23.5
Liberal Democrats	Sarah Lowes	266	17.0
Liberal Democrats	Vaughan Miller	206	13.2
Majority		470	30.0
Turnout		1,596	28%
Registered electors		5,712	
Rejected ballots		33	2.1
Conservative **win** (new seat)			
Conservative **win** (new seat)			

== By-elections ==
=== Tilehurst South and Holybrook ===
The by-election was triggered by the death of Conservative councillor Peter Argyle, announced on 7 October 2021.

Tilehurst South and Holybrook: 16 December 2021
Party	Candidate	Votes	%	±%
Conservative	Akinbiyi Oloko	548	42.3	−15.6
Labour	Charles Croal	387	29.9	+4.8
Liberal Democrats	Steve Bown	359	27.7	+10.8
Majority		161	12.4	
Turnout		1,302	23.0	
Conservative hold		Swing	▼10.2	
