= Laura Farris =

British politician (born 1978)

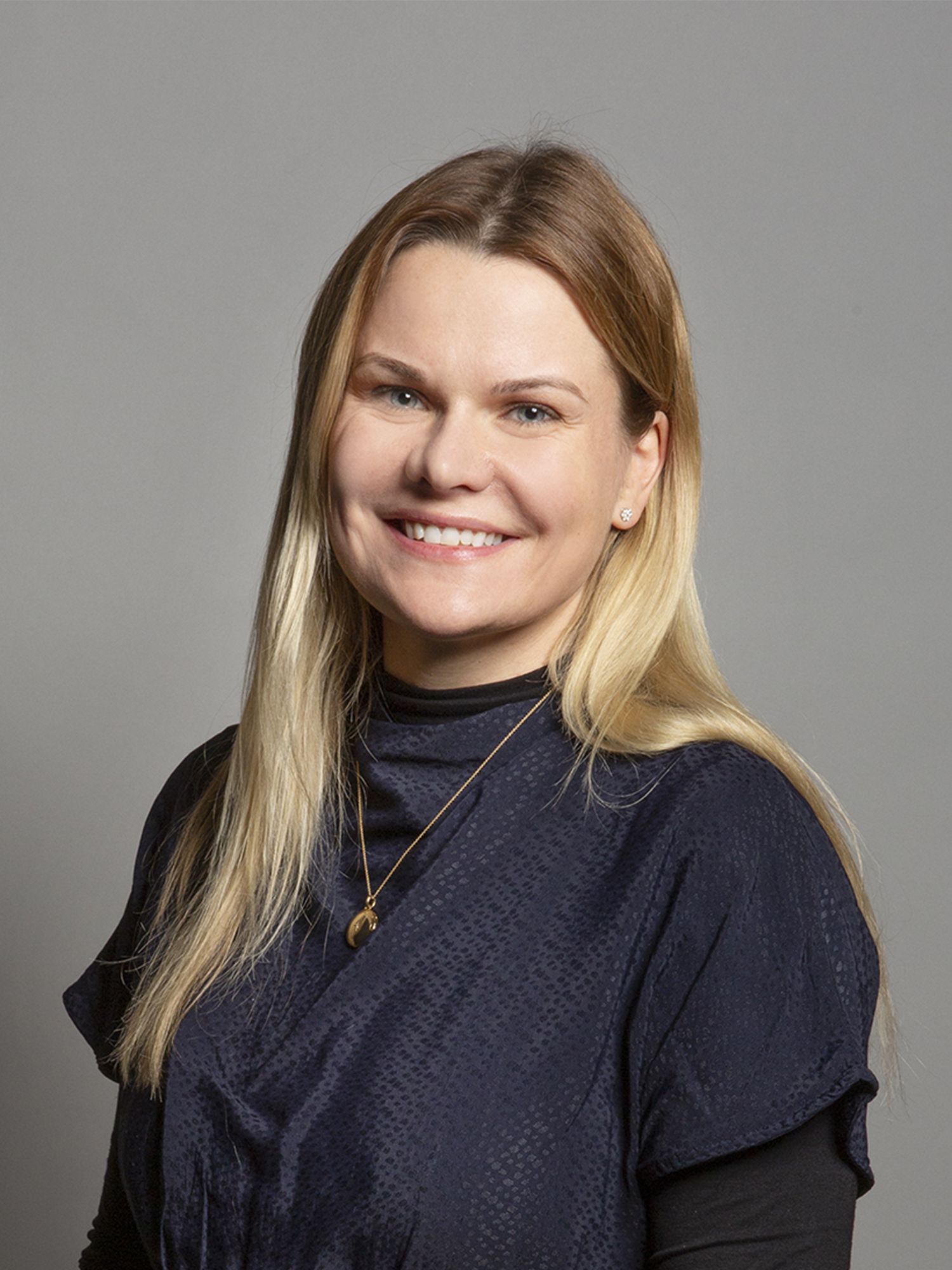
- Official portrait, 2019

Parliamentary Under-Secretary of State for Victims and Safeguarding
- In office 13 November 2023 – 5 July 2024
- Prime Minister: Rishi Sunak
- Preceded by: Edward Argar (Victims); Sarah Dines (Safeguarding)
- Succeeded by: Jess Phillips (Safeguarding); Alex Davies-Jones (Victims)

Member of Parliament for Newbury
- In office 12 December 2019 – 30 May 2024
- Preceded by: Richard Benyon
- Succeeded by: Lee Dillon

Personal details
- Born: Laura Rose McNair-Wilson; 13 June 1978 (age 48) London, England
- Party: Conservative
- Spouse: Henry Farris (m. 2011)
- Children: 2
- Parent: Michael McNair-Wilson (father)
- Relatives: Patrick McNair-Wilson (uncle)
- Education: Lady Margaret Hall, Oxford
- Profession: Barrister; journalist
- Website: Official website

Laura Rose Farris (née McNair-Wilson; born 13 June 1978) is a British former Conservative politician who was the Member of Parliament (MP) for Newbury from 2019 until 2024. Prior to her parliamentary career, she worked as a journalist and later as a barrister. She was Parliamentary Under-Secretary of State for Victims and Safeguarding from November 2023 until July 2024. After losing her seat in the 2024 general election, Farris became a partner and Head of UK Litigation Communications at the public affairs consultancy FGS Global in 2025.

== Early life and career ==
Laura McNair-Wilson was born on 13 June 1978 at London's Westminster Hospital to Michael McNair-Wilson and Deidre Granville (née Tuckett). She was an only child and grew up in Bucklebury, Berkshire. Her father Michael and her uncle Patrick McNair-Wilson were Conservative MPs.

She studied philosophy, politics and economics at Lady Margaret Hall, Oxford, graduating in 2000 with an upper second class degree. She also holds a Graduate Diploma in Law from City, University of London, graduating in 2006, and took the Bar Vocational Course at BPP Law School in 2007. She qualified as a barrister in 2007, practising mainly in employment law. Farris was appointed to the panel of counsel operated by the Equality and Human Rights Commission in 2015.

Farris worked as a journalist for BBC and Reuters and also worked as a researcher for Hillary Clinton when she was a United States Senator for New York.

== Parliamentary career ==
At the snap 2017 general election, Farris stood as the Conservative candidate in Leyton and Wanstead, coming second with 20.8% of the vote behind the incumbent Labour MP John Cryer.

Farris was selected as the Conservative candidate for Newbury on 10 November 2019. At the 2019 general election, Farris was elected as MP for Newbury, winning with 57.4% of the vote and a majority of 16,047 votes. Her father had represented the constituency between 1974 and 1992.

She was a member of the Justice Select Committee between June 2021 and November 2022 and the Privileges Committee and the Standards Committee from March to October 2022. Farris was a member of the Home Affairs Select Committee from March 2020 to March 2022. She identifies as a one-nation conservative.

On 22 October 2021, Farris opposed a bill to prevent employers from firing employees and rehiring them on worse terms and conditions. She stated during the debate that the rules on fire and rehire needed to be tightened up, but the choice should be available as "an option of last resort" for companies facing insolvency. In November 2021, a man was convicted of sending a malicious communication to Farris in 2020 and given a suspended sentence.

Farris endorsed Rishi Sunak in the 2022 Conservative Party leadership election. She was the Parliamentary Under-Secretary of State for Victims and Safeguarding between November 2023 and July 2024. Farris lost her seat in the 2024 general election to the Liberal Democrats candidate Lee Dillon.

== Post-parliamentary career ==
Farris was appointed in 2025 as a partner and the Head of UK Litigation Communications at the public affairs consultancy FGS Global.

== Personal life ==
In 2011, Laura married Henry Farris in Taunton, Somerset. The couple have two daughters and live in West Berkshire.

Parliament of the United Kingdom
Preceded by Richard Benyon	Member of Parliament for Newbury; 2019–2024	Succeeded by Lee Dillon
