= 2003 West Berkshire Council election =

Local government election in England

Map of the results of the 2003 West Berkshire Borough Council election. Conservative in blue and Liberal Democrats in yellow.

The 2003 West Berkshire Council election took place on 1 May 2003 to elect members of West Berkshire Council in Berkshire, England. The whole council was up for election with boundary changes since the last election in 2000 reducing the number of seats by two. The Liberal Democrats lost overall control of the council to no overall control.

== Background ==
At the last election in 2000 the Liberal Democrats held control of the council with 28 councillors, compared to 25 for the Conservatives and there was 1 independent councillor. However boundary changes took place for the 2003 election, which reduced the number of seats from 54 to 52 and affected all but 3 of the wards.

== Election result ==
Both the Conservatives and Liberal Democrats won 26 seats, meaning that the Liberal Democrats lost the majority on the council that they had held for the previous 12 years. The Liberal Democrat leader on the council, Lena Rust was defeated in Basildon ward by the Conservatives, while in Westwood ward the Conservatives gained the seat by 4 votes after 4 recounts. However the Liberal Democrats did pick up a seat in the new Theale ward.

Following the election the Liberal Democrats were able to continue running the council due to the chairman's casting vote.

West Berkshire local election result 2003
| Party | Seats | Gains | Losses | Net gain/loss | Seats % | Votes % | Votes | +/− |
|---|---|---|---|---|---|---|---|---|
| Conservative | 26 | | | +1 | 50.0 | 50.3 | 33,815 | |
| Liberal Democrats | 26 | | | -2 | 50.0 | 45.6 | 30,628 | |
| Labour | 0 | | | 0 | 0 | 3.1 | 2,104 | |
| Green | 0 | | | 0 | 0 | 0.5 | 307 | |
| Independent | 0 | | | -1 | 0 | 0.4 | 294 | |
| Socialist Labour | 0 | | | 0 | 0 | 0.1 | 59 | |

== Ward results ==
Aldermaston
| Party | Candidate | Votes | % | ±% |
|---|---|---|---|---|
| Conservative | Irene Neill | 677 | 70.4 | |
| Liberal Democrats | Douglas Gibbons | 284 | 29.6 | |
| Majority | | 393 | 40.9 | |
| Turnout | | 961 | 48 | |

Basildon
| Party | Candidate | Votes | % | ±% |
|---|---|---|---|---|
| Conservative | Christopher Webber | 684 | 55.9 | |
| Liberal Democrats | Lena Rust | 539 | 44.1 | |
| Majority | | 145 | 11.8 | |
| Turnout | | 1,223 | 55 | |

Birch Copse (3 seats)
| Party | Candidate | Votes | % | ±% |
|---|---|---|---|---|
| Conservative | Michael Mooney | 806 | | |
| Conservative | Anthony Linden | 733 | | |
| Conservative | Andrew Kilgour | 716 | | |
| Labour | Clive Taylor | 443 | | |
| Liberal Democrats | Stephen Bown | 412 | | |
| Liberal Democrats | Vera Barnett | 356 | | |
| Liberal Democrats | Nagalingamudaly Sidamparaooillai | 316 | | |
| Turnout | | 3,782 | | |

Bucklebury (2 seats)
| Party | Candidate | Votes | % | ±% |
|---|---|---|---|---|
| Conservative | Graham Pask | 1,345 | | |
| Conservative | Quentin Webb | 1,188 | | |
| Liberal Democrats | Alastair Reed | 523 | | |
| Liberal Democrats | Astrid Roberts | 425 | | |
| Turnout | | 3,481 | | |

Burghfield (2 seats)
| Party | Candidate | Votes | % | ±% |
|---|---|---|---|---|
| Liberal Democrats | Royce Longton | 975 | | |
| Liberal Democrats | John Farrin | 933 | | |
| Conservative | Anthony Orme | 688 | | |
| Conservative | Deborah Bartley-Brown | 656 | | |
| Turnout | | 3,252 | | |

Calcot (3 seats)
| Party | Candidate | Votes | % | ±% |
|---|---|---|---|---|
| Conservative | Brian Bedwell | 972 | | |
| Conservative | Peter Argyle | 876 | | |
| Conservative | Manohar Gopal | 835 | | |
| Labour | Michael Thompson | 428 | | |
| Liberal Democrats | Craig Drury | 285 | | |
| Liberal Democrats | Chris Gee | 282 | | |
| Liberal Democrats | Paul Walter | 255 | | |
| Turnout | | 3,933 | | |

Chieveley
| Party | Candidate | Votes | % | ±% |
|---|---|---|---|---|
| Conservative | Nora French | 468 | 68.3 | |
| Liberal Democrats | Sarah Hendel-Blackford | 217 | 31.7 | |
| Majority | | 251 | 36.6 | |
| Turnout | | 685 | 38 | |

Clay Hill (2 seats)
| Party | Candidate | Votes | % | ±% |
|---|---|---|---|---|
| Liberal Democrats | Philip Barnett | 793 | | |
| Liberal Democrats | Trevor Banning | 732 | | |
| Conservative | Jeoffrey Beck | 669 | | |
| Conservative | Alma Beck | 666 | | |
| Labour | Barry Lambert | 103 | | |
| Turnout | | 2,963 | 35 | |

Cold Ash
| Party | Candidate | Votes | % | ±% |
|---|---|---|---|---|
| Conservative | Geoffrey Findlay | 598 | 55.2 | |
| Liberal Democrats | Christopher Marriage | 486 | 44.8 | |
| Majority | | 112 | 10.4 | |
| Turnout | | 1,084 | 50 | |

Compton
| Party | Candidate | Votes | % | ±% |
|---|---|---|---|---|
| Conservative | Barbara Alexander | 622 | 60.4 | |
| Liberal Democrats | Patricia Harris | 408 | 39.6 | |
| Majority | | 214 | 20.8 | |
| Turnout | | 1,030 | 46 | |

Downlands
| Party | Candidate | Votes | % | ±% |
|---|---|---|---|---|
| Conservative | George Chandler | 609 | 60.0 | |
| Independent | John Morgan | 294 | 29.0 | |
| Labour | Paul Johnston | 112 | 11.0 | |
| Majority | | 315 | 31.0 | |
| Turnout | | 1,015 | 46 | |

Falkland (2 seats)
| Party | Candidate | Votes | % | ±% |
|---|---|---|---|---|
| Liberal Democrats | Caroline Suggett | 1,137 | | |
| Liberal Democrats | Valerie Bull | 1,068 | | |
| Conservative | Adrian Edwards | 1,026 | | |
| Conservative | Richard Kingsley | 982 | | |
| Labour | Carol Sambrook | 158 | | |
| Turnout | | 4,371 | 46 | |

Greenham (2 seats)
| Party | Candidate | Votes | % | ±% |
|---|---|---|---|---|
| Liberal Democrats | William Drummond | 728 | | |
| Liberal Democrats | Julian Swift-Hook | 675 | | |
| Conservative | Brian Jolly | 585 | | |
| Conservative | Antony Forward | 555 | | |
| Turnout | | 2,543 | 38 | |

Hungerford (2 seats)
| Party | Candidate | Votes | % | ±% |
|---|---|---|---|---|
| Liberal Democrats | Denise Gaines | 1,065 | | |
| Liberal Democrats | James Mole | 1,046 | | |
| Conservative | David Liddiard | 885 | | |
| Conservative | Victoria Clarke | 881 | | |
| Turnout | | 3,877 | | |

Kintbury (2 seats)
| Party | Candidate | Votes | % | ±% |
|---|---|---|---|---|
| Conservative | Anthony Stansfeld | 1,000 | | |
| Conservative | Andrew Rowles | 997 | | |
| Liberal Democrats | Linda Alton | 439 | | |
| Liberal Democrats | James Russell | 403 | | |
| Turnout | | 2,839 | 37 | |

Lambourn Valley (2 seats)
| Party | Candidate | Votes | % | ±% |
|---|---|---|---|---|
| Conservative | Arthur Jones | 705 | | |
| Conservative | Amos Lundie | 502 | | |
| Liberal Democrats | Susan Cocker | 447 | | |
| Liberal Democrats | John Davies | 389 | | |
| Turnout | | 2,043 | 24 | |

Mortimer (2 seats)
| Party | Candidate | Votes | % | ±% |
|---|---|---|---|---|
| Liberal Democrats | Keith Lock | 1,104 | | |
| Liberal Democrats | Sandra Harding | 1,047 | | |
| Conservative | Antony Barker | 440 | | |
| Conservative | Francis Shorrock | 400 | | |
| Turnout | | 2,991 | 39 | |

Northcroft (2 seats)
| Party | Candidate | Votes | % | ±% |
|---|---|---|---|---|
| Liberal Democrats | Susan Farrant | 460 | | |
| Liberal Democrats | Anthony Vickers | 407 | | |
| Conservative | Charlotte Farrow | 330 | | |
| Conservative | Barrington Tristram | 302 | | |
| Labour | Stephen Billcliffe | 152 | | |
| Turnout | | 1,651 | | |

Pangbourne
| Party | Candidate | Votes | % | ±% |
|---|---|---|---|---|
| Conservative | Susan Kemp | 591 | 74.2 | |
| Liberal Democrats | Christopher Cutler | 127 | 15.9 | |
| Labour | Cara Brenda | 79 | 9.9 | |
| Majority | | 464 | 58.3 | |
| Turnout | | 797 | 36 | |

Purley on Thames (2 seats)
| Party | Candidate | Votes | % | ±% |
|---|---|---|---|---|
| Conservative | Timothy Metcalfe | 577 | | |
| Conservative | John Chapman | 550 | | |
| Liberal Democrats | Brian Dowding | 414 | | |
| Liberal Democrats | Robert Bird | 376 | | |
| Green | Miriam Kennet | 194 | | |
| Green | Marlyn Lee | 113 | | |
| Labour | Senan Hartney | 108 | | |
| Turnout | | 2,332 | 24 | |

Speen (2 seats)
| Party | Candidate | Votes | % | ±% |
|---|---|---|---|---|
| Conservative | Paul Bryant | 1,006 | | |
| Conservative | Marcus Franks | 910 | | |
| Liberal Democrats | Clive Hillman | 756 | | |
| Liberal Democrats | Michaela Tod | 692 | | |
| Labour | Michael Lamden | 90 | | |
| Turnout | | 3,454 | 39 | |

St Johns (2 seats)
| Party | Candidate | Votes | % | ±% |
|---|---|---|---|---|
| Liberal Democrats | Sally Hannon | 838 | | |
| Conservative | Emma Webster | 818 | | |
| Conservative | Michael Johnston | 815 | | |
| Liberal Democrats | Roger Hunneman | 803 | | |
| Labour | Derek Brear | 124 | | |
| Turnout | | 3,398 | 40 | |

Sulhamstead
| Party | Candidate | Votes | % | ±% |
|---|---|---|---|---|
| Conservative | Keith Chopping | 460 | 51.2 | |
| Liberal Democrats | David Shepherd | 439 | 48.8 | |
| Majority | | 21 | 2.4 | |
| Turnout | | 899 | 44 | |

Thatcham Central (2 seats)
| Party | Candidate | Votes | % | ±% |
|---|---|---|---|---|
| Liberal Democrats | Alexander Payton | 717 | | |
| Liberal Democrats | Paul Pritchard | 690 | | |
| Conservative | Ellen Crumly | 529 | | |
| Conservative | Richard Crumly | 528 | | |
| Turnout | | 2,464 | | |

Thatcham North (2 seats)
| Party | Candidate | Votes | % | ±% |
|---|---|---|---|---|
| Liberal Democrats | Robert Judge | 703 | | |
| Liberal Democrats | Mollie Lock | 626 | | |
| Conservative | Paul Broome | 431 | | |
| Conservative | Luke Smith | 386 | | |
| Turnout | | 2,146 | | |

Thatcham South and Crookham (2 seats)
| Party | Candidate | Votes | % | ±% |
|---|---|---|---|---|
| Liberal Democrats | Owen Jeffery | 757 | | |
| Liberal Democrats | Terence Port | 657 | | |
| Conservative | Samantha Bennett | 437 | | |
| Conservative | Piero Pagliaroli | 380 | | |
| Turnout | | 2,231 | | |

Thatcham West (2 seats)
| Party | Candidate | Votes | % | ±% |
|---|---|---|---|---|
| Liberal Democrats | Jeffrey Brooks | 760 | | |
| Liberal Democrats | Keith Woodhams | 758 | | |
| Conservative | Rosemary Goodchild | 443 | | |
| Conservative | Matthew Wilson | 411 | | |
| Turnout | | 2,372 | | |

Theale
| Party | Candidate | Votes | % | ±% |
|---|---|---|---|---|
| Liberal Democrats | Alan Macro | 283 | 41.4 | |
| Conservative | Lionel Turner | 231 | 33.8 | |
| Labour | Terence Jackson | 169 | 24.7 | |
| Majority | | 52 | 7.6 | |
| Turnout | | 683 | 32 | |

Victoria (2 seats)
| Party | Candidate | Votes | % | ±% |
|---|---|---|---|---|
| Liberal Democrats | Alan Craw | 662 | | |
| Liberal Democrats | Michael Rodger | 645 | | |
| Conservative | Brian Goodall | 315 | | |
| Conservative | Rebecca Smith | 306 | | |
| Socialist Labour | Katrina Howse | 59 | | |
| Turnout | | 1,987 | 30 | |

Westwood
| Party | Candidate | Votes | % | ±% |
|---|---|---|---|---|
| Conservative | Laszlo Zverko | 293 | 40.7 | |
| Liberal Democrats | Graham Reeves | 289 | 40.1 | |
| Labour | Robert Tutton | 138 | 19.2 | |
| Majority | | 4 | 0.6 | |
| Turnout | | 720 | 32.0 | |

== By-elections between 2003 and 2007 ==
=== Victoria ===
The Liberal Democrats remained in control of the council with the chairman's casting vote after retaining Victoria ward in a by-election on 4 December 2003.

Victoria by-election 4 December 2003
| Party | Candidate | Votes | % | ±% |
|---|---|---|---|---|
| Liberal Democrats | Roger Hunneman | 727 | 58.6 | −5.3 |
| Conservative | Jeffrey Beck | 461 | 37.2 | +6.8 |
| Labour | Barry Lambert | 52 | 4.2 | +4.2 |
| Majority | | 266 | 21.4 | |
| Turnout | | 1,240 | 39.9 | +10.0 |
| Liberal Democrats hold | | Swing | | |

=== Thatcham North ===
A by-election was held in Thatcham North on 5 May 2005 after Liberal Democrat councillor Bob Judge resigned from the council. The seat was gained for the Conservatives by Sheila Ellison with a majority of 175 votes over the Liberal Democrats, which gave the Conservatives a majority on the council.

Thatcham North by-election 5 May 2005
| Party | Candidate | Votes | % | ±% |
|---|---|---|---|---|
| Conservative | Sheila Ellison | 1,431 | 53.3 | +15.0 |
| Liberal Democrats | Graham Reeves | 1,256 | 46.7 | −15.0 |
| Majority | | 175 | 6.6 | |
| Turnout | | 2,687 | 68.6 | |
| Conservative gain from Liberal Democrats | | Swing | | |

=== Pangbourne ===
A by-election was held in Pangbourne ward on 20 April 2006 after the resignation of Conservative councillor Susie Kemp. The seat was held for the Conservatives by Pamela Bale with a majority of 574 votes over the Liberal Democrats.

Pangbourne by-election 20 April 2006
| Party | Candidate | Votes | % | ±% |
|---|---|---|---|---|
| Conservative | Pamela Bale | 725 | 74.6 | +0.4 |
| Liberal Democrats | Stephen Brown | 151 | 15.5 | −0.4 |
| Labour | Senan Hartney | 96 | 9.9 | 0.0 |
| Majority | | 574 | 59.1 | +0.9 |
| Turnout | | 972 | 45.1 | +9.0 |
| Conservative hold | | Swing | | |
