= Parliamentary Under-Secretary of State for Victims, Violence Against Women and Girls and International Justice =

United Kingdom Parliamentary Under-Secretary of State for Victims, Violence Against Women and Girls and International Justice
- Royal Arms of His Majesty's Government

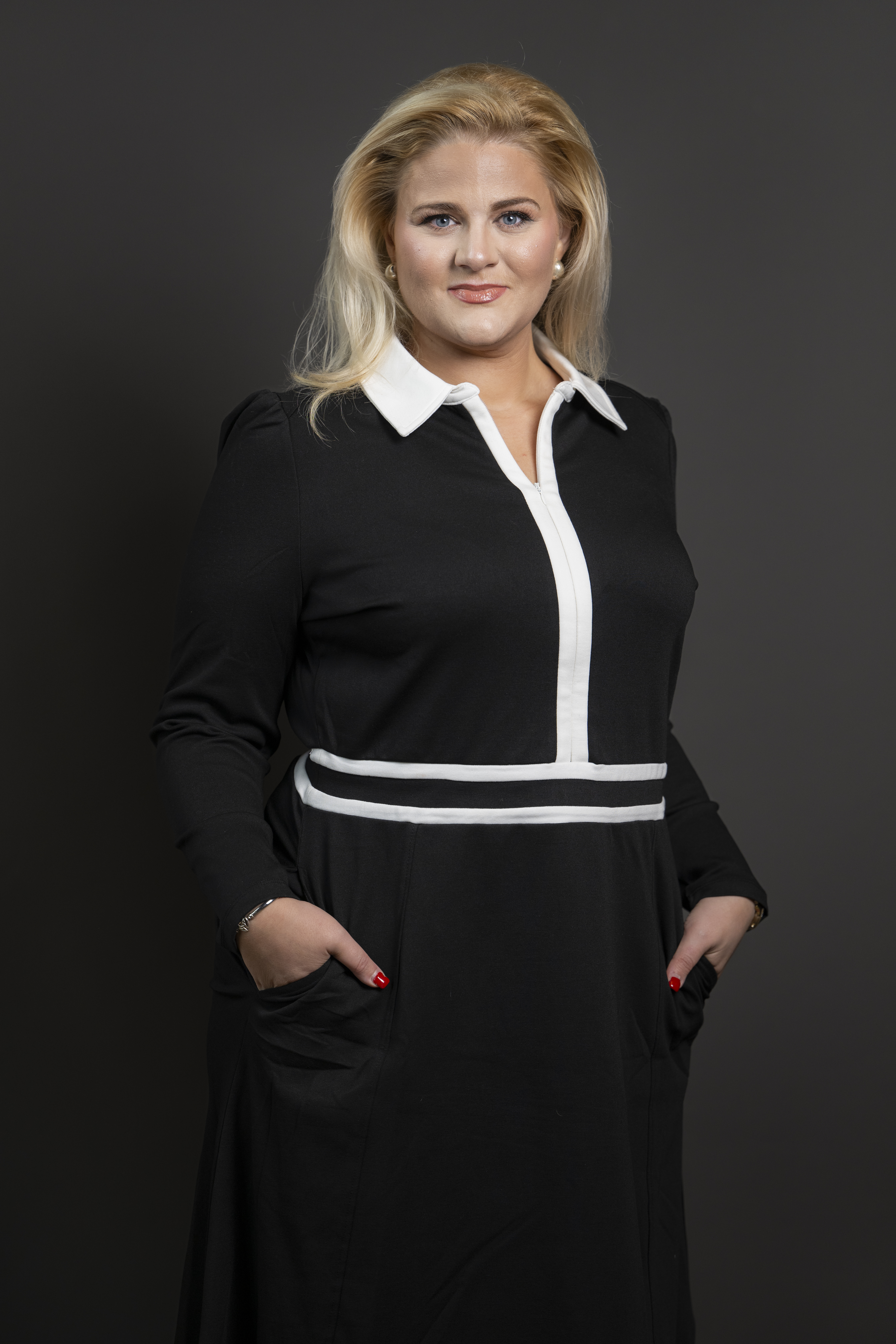
- Incumbent; Alex Davies-Jones since 22 July 2026
- Ministry of Justice
- Style: Minister
- Appointer: The Monarch; on advice of the Prime Minister
- Website: Parliamentary Under-Secretary of State (Minister for Victims, Violence Against Women and Girls (VAWG) and International Justice)

The Parliamentary Under-Secretary of State for Victims, Violence Against Women and Girls and International Justice (also known as Minister for Victims) is a junior role in His Majesty's Government in the Ministry of Justice. The role has been held by Alex Davies-Jones MP since 22 July 2026, who had previously held the office from 9 July 2024 to 12 May 2026.

== Responsibilities ==
The minister has the following responsibilities:

- Violence Against Women and Girls (VAWG)
- Criminal Law
- Victims, Witnesses and Vulnerabilities
- Criminal Injuries Compensation Authority
- Rape and Serious Sexual Offences (RASSO)
- Victims and Courts Bill (VAC)
- Hillsborough
- Death Management, Inquiries and Coroners
- Miscarriages of Justice
- Criminal Cases Review Commission
- MOJ Mission lead for Safer Streets

== List of ministers ==
Name	Portrait	Term of office		Party	Ministry
Parliamentary Under-Secretary of State for Legal Aid and Civil Justice
David Lammy		13 June 2003	10 May 2005	Labour	Blair II
Parliamentary Under-Secretary of State for Civil and Family Legal Aid
Vera Baird		5 May 2006	2 July 2007	Labour	Blair III
Parliamentary Under-Secretary of State for Courts and Criminal Justice
Maria Eagle		2 July 2007	9 June 2009	Labour	Brown
Claire Ward		15 May 2009	11 May 2010	Labour	Brown
Parliamentary Under-Secretary of State for Courts and Victims
Helen Grant		4 September 2012	7 October 2013	Conservartive	Cameron–Clegg
Minister of State for Justice and Civil Liberties
Simon Hughes		18 December 2013	8 May 2015	Liberal Democrats	Cameron–Clegg
Parliamentary Under-Secretary of State for Family Justice					
Caroline Dinenage		8 May 2015	16 July 2016	Conservative	Cameron II
Parliamentary Under-Secretary of State for Victims, Youth and Family Justice
Phillip Lee		17 July 2016	12 June 2018	Conservative	May I and II
Parliamentary Under-Secretary of State for Justice
Edward Argar		14 June 2018	10 September 2019	Conservative	May II; Johnson I
Wendy Morton		26 July 2019	13 February 2020	Conservative	Johnson I Johnson II
Minister of State for Victims and Vulnerability
Rachel Maclean		7 September 2022	28 October 2022	Conservative	Truss
Minister of State for Victims and Sentencing
Edward Argar		28 October 2022	13 November 2023	Conservative	Sunak
Parliamentary Under-Secretary of State for Victims and Safeguarding (Jointly with the Home Office)
Laura Farris		13 November 2023	5 July 2024	Conservative	Sunak
Parliamentary Under-Secretary of State for Victims and Tackling Violence Against Women and Girls
Alex Davies-Jones		9 July 2024	12 May 2026	Labour	Starmer
Catherine Atkinson		12 May 2026	22 July 2026	Labour	Starmer
Parliamentary Under-Secretary of State for Victims, Violence Against Women and Girls and International Justice
Alex Davies-Jones		22 May 2026	Incumbent	Labour	Burnham
