= Corey Domachowski =

Welsh rugby union player

- Born: 19 September 1996 (age 30) Church Village, Rhondda Cynon Taf, Wales
- Height: 1.83 m (6 ft 0 in)
- Weight: 124 kg (273 lb; 19 st 7 lb)
- School: Tonyrefail School

Rugby union career
- Position: Loosehead Prop
- Current team: Scarlets
Senior career
Years	Team	Apps	(Points)
2015–2026	Cardiff	122	(40)
2026–	Scarlets	0	(0)
International career
Years	Team	Apps	(Points)
2016	Wales U20	10	(0)
2023–	Wales	10	(0)

Corey Domachowski (born 19 September 1996) is a Welsh professional rugby union player who plays as a prop for United Rugby Championship club Scarlets and the Wales national team.

== Early life ==
Domachowski played for Rhondda Schools as a back-row, and was a goal kicker, before converting to prop when he moved to Gilfach Goch RFC.

== Club career ==
=== Cardiff ===
Domachowski made his debut for Cardiff in March 2016 against Glasgow Warriors having previously played for the academy team. The Church Village-born loosehead prop represented Wales at under-20 level, and featured for Cardiff Rugby as a replacement in Challenge Cup quarter final defeat to Gloucester in 2017. He signed his first senior contract with the club in October 2017.

He signed an extension with Cardiff in August 2023, followed by a further extension in January 2024.

=== Scarlets ===
On 30 April 2026, it was announced that Domachowski would leave Cardiff to join the Scarlets. He featured in a preseason friendly against the Dragons, and made his league debut against the Bulls on 31 October 2026.

== International career ==
=== Wales U20 ===
Domachowski represented Wales U20 in 2016, and won the grand slam during the 2016 Six Nations Under 20s Championship.

=== Wales ===
On 1 May 2023, Warren Gatland selected him in Wales' 54 player training squad for the Rugby World Cup 2023.

Domachowski made his debut on 5 August 2023, starting for Wales in the first test of their 2023 Rugby World Cup warm-up matches, in a win against England

== Personal life ==
Domachowski's great-grandfather, Stefan, escaped from the Auschwitz concentration camp and eventually moved to Wales, settling in Pencoed and working as a miner.
