= Catherine Atkinson =

British politician

Catherine Atkinson MP
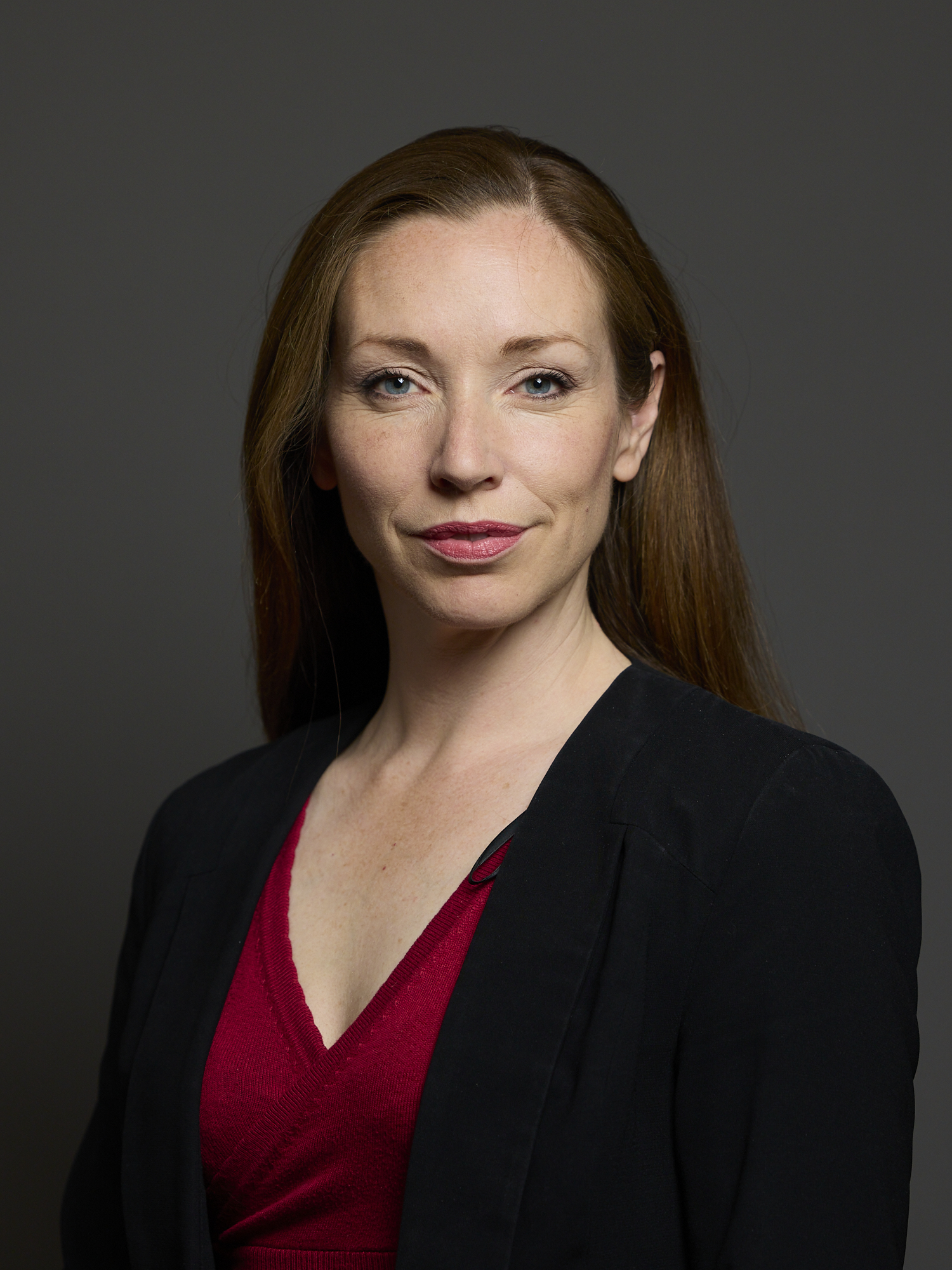
- Official portrait, 2024

Chair of the Justice Select Committee
- Incumbent
- Assumed office 14 September 2026
- Preceded by: Andy Slaughter

Parliamentary Under-Secretary of State for Victims and Tackling Violence Against Women and Girls
- In office 12 May 2026 – 22 July 2026
- Prime Minister: Keir Starmer
- Preceded by: Alex Davies-Jones
- Succeeded by: Alex Davies-Jones

Member of Parliament for Derby North
- Incumbent
- Assumed office 4 July 2024
- Preceded by: Amanda Solloway
- Majority: 8,915 (21.8%)

Personal details
- Born: Catherine Helen Atkinson
- Party: Labour
- Spouse: Daniel
- Education: University of Edinburgh; City St George's, University of London
- Occupation: Politician, barrister
- Website: www.catherineatkinson.com

Catherine Helen Atkinson is a British Labour Party politician and barrister serving as the Member of Parliament (MP) for Derby North since 2024. She defeated Conservative incumbent Amanda Solloway. Atkinson was Parliamentary Under-Secretary of State for Victims and Tackling Violence Against Women and Girls in 2026. She currently serves as Chair of the Justice Select Committee.

== Early life ==
Two of her grandparents were Mexican-American. Atkinson attended Sacred Heart High School, Hammersmith. She graduated a Master of Divinity from the University of Edinburgh.

She studied law at City, University of London. She was called to the bar at Deka Chambers in 2006; her colleague Jake Richards was also elected as a Labour MP at the 2024 General Election.

== Political career ==
Atkinson first stood to become a Member of Parliament in the 2005 general election in the London constituency of Kensington and Chelsea, where she lost to incumbent Conservative MP Malcolm Rifkind.

In 2006, Atkinson was elected as a Labour Councillor for the Royal Borough of Kensington and Chelsea. In May 2009, an unsuccessful motion was put forward to elect her as the next Mayor of Kensington and Chelsea. Her tenure on the council ended in 2010.

Following a brief time away from public politics in the early 2010s, Atkinson stood for election three successive times at the 2015, 2017 and 2019 general elections in Erewash, coming second on each occasion.

Following her candidacy in Erewash, Atkinson was selected as the Labour candidate for Derby North in July 2022, where she would later successfully win the seat with 18,619 votes in the 2024 general election.

As Derby North's MP, Atkinson was a member of the Commons' Transport Select Committee and an officer of four All Party Parliamentary Groups (APPGs), focused on justice, rail and nuclear energy.

On 12 May 2026, Atkinson was appointed Parliamentary Under-Secretary of State in the Ministry of Justice. On 22 July 2026, she left the government two days after Andy Burnham became the Prime Minister.

== Personal life ==
Her husband, Daniel, served in Afghanistan and worked as a firefighter with Derbyshire Fire and Rescue Service.

Parliament of the United Kingdom
| Preceded by Amanda Solloway | Member of Parliament for Derby North; 2024–present | Incumbent |
