= 2011 West Berkshire Council election =

Local government election in England

Map of the results of the 2011 West Berkshire Borough Council election. Conservative in blue and Liberal Democrats in yellow.

The 2011 West Berkshire Council election took place on 5 May 2011 to elect members of West Berkshire Council in Berkshire, England. The whole council was up for election and the Conservative Party stayed in overall control of the council.

== Background ==
At the last election in 2007 the Conservatives won a majority of 20 seats, with 36 councillors, compared to 16 for the Liberal Democrats. By the time of the 2011 election 2 seats were vacant after the death of Liberal Democrat councillor Keith Lock from Mortimer ward and the resignation of Conservative councillor Ellen Crumly from Thatcham Central ward.

Both the Conservatives and Liberal Democrats stood in all 30 wards, while Labour stood in 17 and the Apolitical Democrats and UK Independence Party stood in 2 wards each. There were also 3 independent candidates to make a total of 142 candidates for the 52 seats on the council.

== Election result ==
The Conservatives made a net gain of 3 seats to increase their majority on the council, finishing with 39 councillors, compared to 13 for the Liberal Democrats. The Conservatives picked up seats in Thatcham North and Thatcham South and Crookham from the Liberal Democrats to win the majority of the seats in Thatcham. Meanwhile, Labour failed to win any seats but did increase their share of the vote to just under 10%.

West Berkshire local election result 2011
Party	Seats	Gains	Losses	Net gain/loss	Seats %	Votes %	Votes	+/−
Conservative	39	4	1	+3	75.0	57.4	55,480	-2.0%
Liberal Democrats	13	1	4	-3	25.0	31.7	30,644	-3.6%
Labour	0	0	0	0	0	9.5	9,168	+7.3%
Apolitical Democrats	0	0	0	0	0	0.6	586	+0.6%
Independent	0	0	0	0	0	0.5	458	-1.0%
UKIP	0	0	0	0	0	0.4	355	+0.1%

== Ward results ==
Aldermaston
Party	Candidate	Votes	%	±%
Conservative	Irene Neill	884	79.6	−0.1
Liberal Democrats	Elizabeth Peplow	227	20.4	+0.1
Majority		657	59.1	−0.3
Turnout		1,111	51	+4
Conservative hold		Swing		

Basildon
Party	Candidate	Votes	%	±%
Conservative	Alan Law	1,065	76.8	−6.4
Liberal Democrats	Ceinwen Lally	322	23.2	+6.4
Majority		743	53.6	−12.9
Turnout		1,387	58	+7
Conservative hold		Swing		

Birch Copse (3 seats)
Party	Candidate	Votes	%	±%
Conservative	Michael Mooney	1,482		
Conservative	Anthony Linden	1,342		
Conservative	Emma Webster	1,321		
Labour	Senan Hartney	623		
Labour	Clive Taylor	594		
Labour	James Hutchinson	539		
Liberal Democrats	Sylvia Fowler	341		
Liberal Democrats	Stephen Brown	303		
Liberal Democrats	David Wood	279		
Turnout		6,824	43	+8
Conservative hold		Swing		
Conservative hold		Swing		
Conservative hold		Swing		

Bucklebury (2 seats)
Party	Candidate	Votes	%	±%
Conservative	Graham Pask	1,865		
Conservative	Quentin Webb	1,648		
Liberal Democrats	Benjamin Morgan	611		
Liberal Democrats	Philippa Harper	462		
Turnout		4,586	55	+6
Conservative hold		Swing		
Conservative hold		Swing		

Burghfield (2 seats)
Party	Candidate	Votes	%	±%
Liberal Democrats	Royce Longton	1,210		
Conservative	Carol Jackson-Doerge	1,130		
Conservative	Ian MacFarlane	971		
Liberal Democrats	Nicholas Morse	929		
Turnout		4,240	52	+7
Liberal Democrats hold		Swing		
Conservative hold		Swing		

Calcot (3 seats)
Party	Candidate	Votes	%	±%
Conservative	Brian Bedwell	1,575		
Conservative	Peter Argyle	1,462		
Conservative	Manohar Gopal	1,406		
Labour	Gordon Lewis	746		
Labour	Charles Croal	737		
Labour	Bernadette McNally	568		
Liberal Democrats	Arthur Johnson	200		
Liberal Democrats	Gary Johnson	182		
Liberal Democrats	Pamela Taylor	164		
Turnout		7,040	38	+4
Conservative hold		Swing		
Conservative hold		Swing		
Conservative hold		Swing		

Chieveley
Party	Candidate	Votes	%	±%
Conservative	Hilary Cole	697	71.0	−11.2
Independent	Andrew Fforde-Lutter	189	19.3	+19.3
Liberal Democrats	Richard Johnson	95	9.7	−8.1
Majority		508	51.8	−12.6
Turnout		981	52	+5
Conservative hold		Swing		

Clay Hill (2 seats)
Party	Candidate	Votes	%	±%
Conservative	Jeffrey Beck	1,104		
Conservative	Dave Goff	928		
Liberal Democrats	David Tysoe	572		
Liberal Democrats	Rruwan Uduwerage-Perera	553		
Labour	Johnathan Roberts	292		
Labour	Thomas Satterthwaite	280		
Turnout		3,729	41	+2
Conservative hold		Swing		
Conservative hold		Swing		

Cold Ash
Party	Candidate	Votes	%	±%
Conservative	Garth Simpson	890	73.3	+4.3
Liberal Democrats	Philip Brooks	325	26.7	−4.3
Majority		565	46.5	+8.4
Turnout		1,215		
Conservative hold		Swing		

Compton
Party	Candidate	Votes	%	±%
Conservative	Virginia Celsing	828	70.7	+2.4
Liberal Democrats	Silvia Boschetto	343	29.3	−2.4
Majority		485	41.4	+4.9
Turnout		1,171	52	−1
Conservative hold		Swing		

Downlands
Party	Candidate	Votes	%	±%
Conservative	George Chandler	900	69.9	−0.9
Liberal Democrats	Paul Allen	247	19.2	+5.5
Labour	Paul Johnston	141	10.9	+4.3
Majority		653	50.7	−6.4
Turnout		1,288	56	+4
Conservative hold		Swing		

Falkland (2 seats)
Party	Candidate	Votes	%	±%
Conservative	Adrian Edwards	1,329		
Conservative	Howard Bairstow	1,307		
Liberal Democrats	Bryan Harper	884		
Liberal Democrats	Sam Dibas	758		
Labour	Linda Cooper	213		
UKIP	David Black	205		
Labour	Leslie Cooper	204		
UKIP	David McMahon	150		
Independent	Brian Burgess	132		
Turnout		5,182	57	−1
Conservative hold		Swing		
Conservative hold		Swing		

Greenham (2 seats)
Party	Candidate	Votes	%	±%
Liberal Democrats	William Drummond	868		
Liberal Democrats	Julian Swift-Hook	857		
Conservative	Allan Beal	693		
Conservative	Christopher Austin	688		
Labour	Hannah Cooper	204		
Labour	Gary Puffett	202		
Turnout		3,512	44	+2
Liberal Democrats hold		Swing		
Liberal Democrats hold		Swing		

Hungerford (2 seats)
Party	Candidate	Votes	%	±%
Conservative	Paul Hewer	1,315		
Conservative	David Holtby	1,178		
Liberal Democrats	Denise Gaines	840		
Liberal Democrats	Rhona Sherwood	711		
Turnout		4,044	50	+1
Conservative hold		Swing		
Conservative hold		Swing		

Kintbury (2 seats)
Party	Candidate	Votes	%	±%
Conservative	Anthony Stansfeld	1,417		
Conservative	Andrew Rowles	1,393		
Liberal Democrats	James Mole	493		
Liberal Democrats	Simon Hudson	487		
Turnout		3,790	53	+6
Conservative hold		Swing		
Conservative hold		Swing		

Lambourn Valley (2 seats)
Party	Candidate	Votes	%	±%
Conservative	Arthur Jones	1,489		
Conservative	Arnos Lundie	1,293		
Liberal Democrats	Joyce Easteal	426		
Liberal Democrats	Peter Greenhalgh	229		
Labour	Grahame Murphy	228		
Turnout		3,665	47	+0
Conservative hold		Swing		
Conservative hold		Swing		

Mortimer (2 seats)
Party	Candidate	Votes	%	±%
Liberal Democrats	Mollie Lock	1,337		
Liberal Democrats	Geoffrey Mayes	1,061		
Conservative	Hugh Gunn	996		
Conservative	Sarah Jones	942		
Turnout		4,336	55	+1
Liberal Democrats hold		Swing		
Liberal Democrats hold		Swing		

Northcroft (2 seats)
Party	Candidate	Votes	%	±%
Liberal Democrats	Anthony Vickers	844		
Liberal Democrats	Gwendoline Mason	758		
Conservative	Mauline Akins	701		
Conservative	Leon Larkings	669		
Apolitical Democrats	Charlotte Farrow	195		
Apolitical Democrats	David Yates	181		
Labour	Gerald Orbell	166		
Turnout		3,514	46	+0
Liberal Democrats hold		Swing		
Liberal Democrats hold		Swing		

Pangbourne
Party	Candidate	Votes	%	±%
Conservative	Pamela Bale	876	75.8	−7.0
Labour	Ian Stevens	157	13.6	+8.2
Liberal Democrats	Matthew Shakespeare	122	10.6	+5.0
Majority		719	62.3	−14.3
Turnout		1,155	52	+11
Conservative hold		Swing		

Purley on Thames (2 seats)
Party	Candidate	Votes	%	±%
Conservative	Timothy Metcalfe	1,621		
Conservative	David Betts	1,536		
Labour	Robert Tutton	512		
Labour	Riyad Abboushi	318		
Liberal Democrats	Ann Turner	282		
Liberal Democrats	Paul Walter	226		
Turnout		4,495	48	+10
Conservative hold		Swing		
Conservative hold		Swing		

Speen (2 seats)
Party	Candidate	Votes	%	±%
Conservative	Paul Bryant	1,360		
Conservative	Marcus Franks	1,209		
Liberal Democrats	Susan Farrant	561		
Liberal Democrats	Martha Vickers	419		
Labour	Richard Garvie	325		
Turnout		3,874	53	+9
Conservative hold		Swing		
Conservative hold		Swing		

St Johns
Party	Candidate	Votes	%	±%
Conservative	Michael Johnston	1,133		
Conservative	Robert Tuck	1,071		
Liberal Democrats	Diane Smith	947		
Liberal Democrats	Alexander Payton	938		
Labour	Alan Burgess	320		
Turnout		4,409	54	+5
Conservative hold		Swing		
Conservative hold		Swing		

Sulhamstead
Party	Candidate	Votes	%	±%
Conservative	Keith Chopping	698	68.2	+1.2
Liberal Democrats	Robert Bird	326	31.8	−1.2
Majority		372	36.3	+2.2
Turnout		1,024	47	−4
Conservative hold		Swing		

Thatcham Central (2 seats)
Party	Candidate	Votes	%	±%
Liberal Democrats	David Rendel	1,075		
Conservative	Richard Crumly	873		
Liberal Democrats	Antony Ferguson	774		
Conservative	David Dobson	734		
Labour	Matthew Beadle	236		
Turnout		3,692	45	+6
Liberal Democrats gain from Conservative		Swing		
Conservative hold		Swing		

Thatcham North (2 seats)
Party	Candidate	Votes	%	±%
Conservative	John Horton	961		
Conservative	Sheila Ellison	958		
Liberal Democrats	Michael Cole	726		
Liberal Democrats	Emma Spriggs	607		
Labour	Judith Dear	211		
Labour	Juno Orbell	177		
Turnout		3,640	46	−4
Conservative gain from Liberal Democrats		Swing		
Conservative gain from Liberal Democrats		Swing		

Thatcham South and Crookham
Party	Candidate	Votes	%	±%
Conservative	Dominic Boeck	1,101		
Conservative	Roger Croft	1,082		
Liberal Democrats	Owen Jeffery	940		
Liberal Democrats	Robert Morgan	917		
Labour	Theresa McDowell	239		
Labour	Stephen Schollar	195		
Turnout		4,474	47	+8
Conservative gain from Liberal Democrats		Swing		
Conservative gain from Liberal Democrats		Swing		

Thatcham West (2 seats)
Party	Candidate	Votes	%	±%
Liberal Democrats	Jeffrey Brooks	932		
Liberal Democrats	Keith Woodhams	891		
Conservative	Robert Denton-Powell	771		
Conservative	John Burgoyne-Probyn	698		
Labour	David Hamilton	207		
Independent	George Rattray	137		
Turnout		3,636	40	+3
Liberal Democrats hold		Swing		
Liberal Democrats hold		Swing		

Theale
Party	Candidate	Votes	%	±%
Liberal Democrats	Alan Macro	575	55.6	+4.7
Conservative	Robert Holden	326	31.5	−2.8
Labour	Thomas Adams	134	12.9	+1.2
Majority		249	24.1	+7.5
Turnout		1,035	48	+6
Liberal Democrats hold		Swing		

Victoria (2 seats)
Party	Candidate	Votes	%	±%
Liberal Democrats	David Allen	685		
Liberal Democrats	Roger Hunneman	639		
Conservative	David Moffat	499		
Conservative	Pauline Bastien	491		
Labour	Sean Semple	157		
Apolitical Democrats	David Reid	127		
Apolitical Democrats	Iain Wallace	83		
Turnout		2,681	42	+7
Liberal Democrats hold		Swing		
Liberal Democrats hold		Swing		

Westwood
Party	Candidate	Votes	%	±%
Conservative	Laszlo Zverko	574	59.7	−4.7
Labour	Paul Anderson	243	25.3	+12.6
Liberal Democrats	Richard Croker	144	15.0	−7.8
Majority		331	34.4	−7.2
Turnout		961	44	+5
Conservative hold		Swing		

== By-elections between 2011 and 2015 ==
=== Hungerford ===
A by-election was held in Hungerford ward on 15 August 2013 after the death of Conservative councillor David Holtby. The seat was held for the Conservatives by James Podger with a reduced majority of 59 votes over the Liberal Democrats.

Hungerford by-election 15 August 2013
Party	Candidate	Votes	%	±%
Conservative	James Podger	810	48.4	−12.7
Liberal Democrats	Denise Gaines	751	44.8	+5.9
Labour	Gary Puffett	86	5.1	+5.1
United People's Party	Andrew Stott	28	1.7	+1.7
Majority		59	3.5	−18.6
Turnout		1,675	38.2	−12
Conservative hold		Swing		

=== Purley on Thames ===
A by-election was held in Purley on Thames ward on 28 January 2015 after the death of Conservative councillor David Betts. The seat was held for the Conservatives with a majority of 764 votes over the Labour Party.

Purley on Thames by-election 28 January 2015
Party	Candidate	Votes	%	±%
Conservative	Richard Jones	936	68.1	+1.0
Labour	Ian Stevens	172	12.5	−8.7
UKIP	Catherine Anderson	163	11.9	+11.9
Liberal Democrats	Stephen Bown	104	7.6	−4.1
Majority		764	55.6	+9.7
Turnout		1,375	26.6	−21
Conservative hold		Swing		
