= Lee Dillon =

British politician (born 1983)

Lee Dillon MP
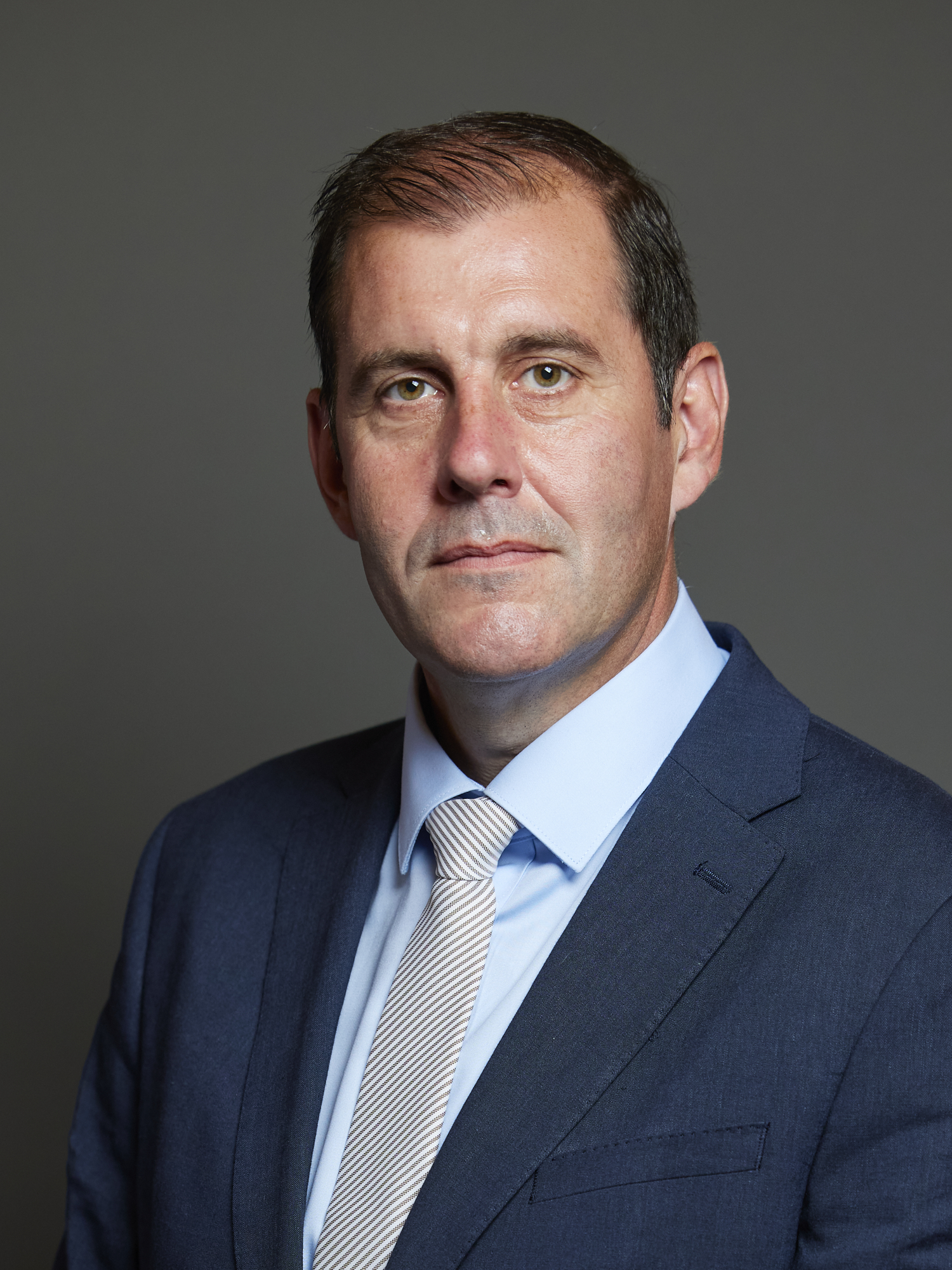
- Official portrait, 2024

Member of Parliament for Newbury
- Incumbent
- Assumed office 4 July 2024
- Preceded by: Laura Farris
- Majority: 2,337 (4.8%)

Leader of West Berkshire Council
- In office 25 May 2023 – 30 April 2024
- Preceded by: Lynne Doherty
- Succeeded by: Jeff Brooks

Mayor of Thatcham
- In office 2010–2012
- Preceded by: Stephanie Steevenson
- Succeeded by: John Boyd

Personal details
- Born: Lee Raymond James Dillon; 1983 (age 42–43) Thatcham, England
- Party: Liberal Democrats
- Website: www.leedillon.co.uk

Lee Raymond James Dillon (born 1983) is a British Liberal Democrat politician who has been Member of Parliament (MP) for Newbury since 2024, gaining the seat from the Conservative incumbent, Laura Farris.

Before entering Parliament, Dillon was a social housing senior manager. He served as the mayor of Thatcham from 2010 to 2012 and the leader of West Berkshire Council from 2023 to 2024.

Dillon describes David Rendel, a former Liberal Democrat MP for Newbury, as his political inspiration.

== Early political career ==
Dillon was elected to Thatcham Town Council in 2007 and represented the ward of Thatcham North East. He served two terms as mayor of Thatcham from 2010 to 2012, becoming the town's youngest mayor when first elected at the age of 27.

Dillon has served as a member of West Berkshire Council from 2007 to 2011 and from 2015 to 2025, representing Thatcham North East and previously Thatcham North. At the 2023 election, the Liberal Democrats assumed majority control of West Berkshire Council, and Dillon was subsequently elected leader of the council on 25 May. He took sabbatical leave from the role on 1 February 2024 before resigning as leader on 30 April to focus on his campaign for the forthcoming general election.

Dillon first stood for election at the 2005 general election in Islwyn, coming third with 12.5 per cent of the vote. He again stood for election in Newbury in the 2019 general election, coming second with 30.6 per cent.

In 2023, Dillon was re-selected as the Liberal Democrat parliamentary candidate for Newbury. He went on to win the constituency at the 2024 general election with 40.1 per cent of the vote, winning the seat for the Liberal Democrats for the first time since the 2001 general election. He gained the seat from the Conservative incumbent, Laura Farris.

== Parliamentary career ==
Dillon sits on the Housing, Communities and Local Government (HCLG) Select Committee, the Procedure Committee, and the Backbench Business Committee. His work in Parliament has focused on chalk streams, flooding and sewage, farmers and the rural economy, connectivity, equestrian road safety, the NHS, SEND provision, housing, cost of living, Thatcham level crossing, and more.

== Personal life ==
Lee grew up in Thatcham, where his family used to own a local pub.

He has a wife and young children. His father was a trade union official.

A keen football fan, he regularly takes his children to watch Reading F.C., and supports his local team, Thatcham Town F.C.

Parliament of the United Kingdom
Preceded by Laura Farris	Member of Parliament for Newbury; 2024–present	Incumbent
