= 2015 West Berkshire Council election =

Local government election in England

Map of the results

The 2015 West Berkshire Council election took place on 7 May 2015 to elect members of West Berkshire Council in England. This was on the same day as other local elections. The whole council was up for election and the Conservative Party retained overall control of the council.

== Background ==
At the last election in 2011, the Conservatives won a majority of seats, with 39 councillors, compared to 13 for the Liberal Democrats. No other parties had representation on the council. Two by-elections were held between the 2011 and 2015 elections, both being retained by the Conservatives.

== Ward results ==
Aldermaston
Party	Candidate	Votes	%	±%
Conservative	Dominic Boeck	1,087	66%	▼14%
Liberal Democrats	James Spackman	390	24%	▲4%
Labour	Leslie Cooper	159	10%	▲10%
Majority		697	42%	▼17%
Turnout		1,636	75%	▲24%
Conservative hold		Swing	▼9%	

Basildon
Party	Candidate	Votes	%	±%
Conservative	Alan Law	1,390	70%	▼7%
Liberal Democrats	Laura Rose Coyle	583	30%	▲7%
Majority		807	40%	▼14%
Turnout		1,973	80%	▲22%
Conservative hold		Swing	▼7%	

Birch Copse (3 seats)
Party	Candidate	Votes	%	±%
Conservative	Anthony Chadley	2,638		
Conservative	Emma Webster	2,319		
Conservative	Anthony Linden	2,288		
Labour	Cara Benda	1,134		
Labour	Senan Hartney	991		
Labour	Clive Taylor	965		
Liberal Democrats	Judith Cooper	445		
Liberal Democrats	David Cooper	441		
Turnout		11,221	73%	▲30%
Conservative hold		Swing		
Conservative hold		Swing		
Conservative hold		Swing		

Bucklebury (2 seats)
Party	Candidate	Votes	%	±%
Conservative	Graham Pask	2,621		
Conservative	Quentin Webb	2,125		
Liberal Democrats	Emma Spriggs	778		
Liberal Democrats	Janette Miranda	611		
Labour	Charlie Hindhaugh	283		
Turnout		6,418	77%	▲22%
Conservative hold		Swing		
Conservative hold		Swing		

Burghfield (2 seats)
Party	Candidate	Votes	%	±%
Conservative	Carol Jackson-Doerge	1,652		
Conservative	Ian Morrin	1,455		
Liberal Democrats	Royce Longton	1,362		
Liberal Democrats	Nicholas Morse	892		
Labour	James Lees	429		
Turnout		5,790	71%	▲19%
Conservative hold		Swing		
Conservative gain from Liberal Democrats		Swing		

Calcot (3 seats)
Party	Candidate	Votes	%	±%
Conservative	Richard Somner	2,458		
Conservative	Peter Argyle	2,326		
Conservative	Manohar Gopal	2,241		
Labour	Charles Croal	1,252		
Labour	Gordon Lewis	1,183		
Labour	Kate Butler	1,116		
Liberal Democrats	Sue Farrant	359		
Liberal Democrats	Susan Prime	336		
Liberal Democrats	Mike Hood	296		
Turnout		11,567	67%	▲29%
Conservative hold		Swing		
Conservative hold		Swing		
Conservative hold		Swing		
