= 2007 West Berkshire Council election =

Local government election in England

Map of the results of the 2007 West Berkshire Borough Council election. Conservative in blue and Liberal Democrats in yellow.

The 2007 West Berkshire Council election took place on 3 May 2007 to elect members of West Berkshire Council in Berkshire, England. The whole council was up for election and the Conservative Party stayed in overall control of the council.

== Background ==
At the last election in 2003 both the Conservatives and Liberal Democrats won 26 seats and the Liberal Democrats kept control with the chairman's casting vote. However the Conservatives took control in May 2005 after gaining a seat from the Liberal Democrats at a by-election.

== Election result ==
The Conservatives increased their majority to 20 seats after gaining seats from the Liberal Democrats. Conservative gains included taking seats in Clay Hill, Falkland and Thatcham Central wards to win 36 seats on the council, but they did lose one seat in Thatcham North to leave the Liberal Democrats on 16 seats. Overall turnout at the election improved to 45%.

West Berkshire local election result 2007
| Party | Seats | Gains | Losses | Net gain/loss | Seats % | Votes % | Votes | +/− |
|---|---|---|---|---|---|---|---|---|
| Conservative | 36 | 10 | 1 | +9 | 69.2 | 59.4 | 52,047 | +9.1% |
| Liberal Democrats | 16 | 1 | 10 | -9 | 30.8 | 35.3 | 30,962 | -10.3% |
| Labour | 0 | 0 | 0 | 0 | 0 | 2.2 | 1,966 | -0.9% |
| Independent | 0 | 0 | 0 | 0 | 0 | 1.5 | 1,330 | +1.1% |
| Green | 0 | 0 | 0 | 0 | 0 | 0.9 | 831 | +0.4% |
| BNP | 0 | 0 | 0 | 0 | 0 | 0.3 | 232 | +0.3% |
| UKIP | 0 | 0 | 0 | 0 | 0 | 0.3 | 224 | +0.3% |

== Ward results ==
Aldermaston
| Party | Candidate | Votes | % | ±% |
|---|---|---|---|---|
| Conservative | Irene Neill | 762 | 79.7 | +9.3 |
| Liberal Democrats | Kath Evans | 194 | 20.3 | −9.3 |
| Majority | | 568 | 59.4 | +18.5 |
| Turnout | | 956 | 46.5 | −1 |
| Conservative hold | | Swing | | |

Basildon
| Party | Candidate | Votes | % | ±% |
|---|---|---|---|---|
| Conservative | Alan Law | 968 | 83.2 | +27.3 |
| Liberal Democrats | Silvia Boschetto | 195 | 16.8 | −27.3 |
| Majority | | 773 | 66.5 | +54.6 |
| Turnout | | 1,163 | 51.2 | −4 |
| Conservative hold | | Swing | | |

Birch Copse (3 seats)
| Party | Candidate | Votes | % | ±% |
|---|---|---|---|---|
| Conservative | Joe Mooney | 1,390 | | |
| Conservative | Tony Linden | 1,340 | | |
| Conservative | Emma Webster | 1,265 | | |
| Labour | Sean Hartney | 509 | | |
| Liberal Democrats | Clive Hillman | 486 | | |
| Liberal Democrats | Susan Prime | 425 | | |
| Liberal Democrats | Paul Pritchard | 357 | | |
| Turnout | | 5,772 | 34.6 | |
| Conservative hold | | Swing | | |
| Conservative hold | | Swing | | |
| Conservative hold | | Swing | | |

Bucklebury (2 seats)
| Party | Candidate | Votes | % | ±% |
|---|---|---|---|---|
| Conservative | Graham Pask | 1,340 | | |
| Conservative | Quentin Webb | 1,283 | | |
| Liberal Democrats | Ben Morgan | 382 | | |
| Liberal Democrats | James Cullen | 283 | | |
| Turnout | | 3,288 | 49.0 | |
| Conservative hold | | Swing | | |
| Conservative hold | | Swing | | |

Burghfield (2 seats)
| Party | Candidate | Votes | % | ±% |
|---|---|---|---|---|
| Liberal Democrats | Royce Longton | 991 | | |
| Conservative | Carol Jackson-Doerge | 956 | | |
| Conservative | Michael Wright | 946 | | |
| Liberal Democrats | John Farrin | 921 | | |
| Turnout | | 3,814 | 44.9 | |
| Liberal Democrats hold | | Swing | | |
| Conservative gain from Liberal Democrats | | Swing | | |

Calcot (3 seats)
| Party | Candidate | Votes | % | ±% |
|---|---|---|---|---|
| Conservative | Brian Bedwell | 1,507 | | |
| Conservative | Peter Argyle | 1,354 | | |
| Conservative | Manohar Gopal | 1,254 | | |
| Independent | Edmund Savage | 531 | | |
| Labour | Glenn Dennis | 504 | | |
| Liberal Democrats | Chris Day | 311 | | |
| Liberal Democrats | Gina Houghton | 282 | | |
| Green | Jacob Sanders | 270 | | |
| Liberal Democrats | Mark Thatcher | 197 | | |
| Turnout | | 6,210 | 34.10 | |
| Conservative hold | | Swing | | |
| Conservative hold | | Swing | | |
| Conservative hold | | Swing | | |

Chieveley
| Party | Candidate | Votes | % | ±% |
|---|---|---|---|---|
| Conservative | Hilary Cole | 720 | 82.2 | +13.9 |
| Liberal Democrats | John Steels | 156 | 17.8 | −13.9 |
| Majority | | 564 | 64.4 | +27.8 |
| Turnout | | 876 | 46.8 | +9 |
| Conservative hold | | Swing | | |

Clay Hill (2 seats)
| Party | Candidate | Votes | % | ±% |
|---|---|---|---|---|
| Conservative | Jeff Beck | 986 | | |
| Conservative | Dave Goff | 892 | | |
| Liberal Democrats | Phil Barnett | 817 | | |
| Liberal Democrats | Pam Taylor | 717 | | |
| Labour | Barry Lambert | 88 | | |
| Turnout | | 3,500 | 38.6 | +4 |
| Conservative gain from Liberal Democrats | | Swing | | |
| Conservative gain from Liberal Democrats | | Swing | | |

Cold Ash
| Party | Candidate | Votes | % | ±% |
|---|---|---|---|---|
| Conservative | Geoff Findlay | 834 | 69.0 | +13.8 |
| Liberal Democrats | Rod King | 374 | 31.0 | −13.8 |
| Majority | | 460 | 38.1 | +27.8 |
| Turnout | | 1,208 | 54.1 | +4.1 |
| Conservative hold | | Swing | | |

Compton
| Party | Candidate | Votes | % | ±% |
|---|---|---|---|---|
| Conservative | Barbara Alexander | 798 | 68.3 | +7.9 |
| Liberal Democrats | Peter Newman | 371 | 31.7 | −7.9 |
| Majority | | 427 | 36.5 | +15.7 |
| Turnout | | 1,169 | 52.8 | +7 |
| Conservative hold | | Swing | | |

Downlands
| Party | Candidate | Votes | % | ±% |
|---|---|---|---|---|
| Conservative | George Chandler | 826 | 70.8 | +10.8 |
| Liberal Democrats | Paul Walter | 160 | 13.7 | +13.7 |
| Green | Adrian Hollister | 104 | 8.9 | +8.9 |
| Labour | Yogi Johnston | 77 | 6.6 | −4.4 |
| Majority | | 666 | 57.1 | +26.1 |
| Turnout | | 1,167 | 51.7 | +6 |
| Conservative hold | | Swing | | |

Falkland (2 seats)
| Party | Candidate | Votes | % | ±% |
|---|---|---|---|---|
| Conservative | Adrian Edwards | 1,537 | | |
| Conservative | Howard Bairstow | 1,510 | | |
| Liberal Democrats | Mavis Greenhalgh | 1,070 | | |
| Liberal Democrats | Peter Greenhalgh | 1,070 | | |
| Labour | Derek Brear | 100 | | |
| Turnout | | 5,287 | 57.9 | +12 |
| Conservative gain from Liberal Democrats | | Swing | | |
| Conservative gain from Liberal Democrats | | Swing | | |

Greenham (2 seats)
| Party | Candidate | Votes | % | ±% |
|---|---|---|---|---|
| Liberal Democrats | Billy Drummond | 868 | | |
| Liberal Democrats | Julian Swift-Hook | 804 | | |
| Conservative | Chris Austin | 663 | | |
| Conservative | Ken Neal | 621 | | |
| Labour | Hannah Cooper | 101 | | |
| Turnout | | 3,057 | 41.5 | +4 |
| Liberal Democrats hold | | Swing | | |
| Liberal Democrats hold | | Swing | | |

Hungerford (2 seats)
| Party | Candidate | Votes | % | ±% |
|---|---|---|---|---|
| Conservative | Paul Hewer | 1,244 | | |
| Conservative | David Holtby | 1,189 | | |
| Liberal Democrats | Denise Gaines | 924 | | |
| Liberal Democrats | James Mole | 821 | | |
| Turnout | | 4,178 | 49.0 | |
| Conservative gain from Liberal Democrats | | Swing | | |
| Conservative gain from Liberal Democrats | | Swing | | |

Kintbury (2 seats)
| Party | Candidate | Votes | % | ±% |
|---|---|---|---|---|
| Conservative | Andrew Rowles | 1,224 | | |
| Conservative | Anthony Stansfeld | 1,211 | | |
| Liberal Democrats | Christopher Doyle | 455 | | |
| Liberal Democrats | Ian O'Callaghan | 380 | | |
| Turnout | | 3,270 | 46.5 | +10 |
| Conservative hold | | Swing | | |
| Conservative hold | | Swing | | |

Lambourn Valley (2 seats)
| Party | Candidate | Votes | % | ±% |
|---|---|---|---|---|
| Conservative | Graham Jones | 1,514 | | |
| Conservative | Gordon Lundie | 1,343 | | |
| Liberal Democrats | John Davies | 409 | | |
| Liberal Democrats | Joyce Easteal | 350 | | |
| Labour | Grahame Murphy | 85 | | |
| Turnout | | 3,701 | 46.8 | +23 |
| Conservative hold | | Swing | | |
| Conservative hold | | Swing | | |

Mortimer (2 seats)
| Party | Candidate | Votes | % | ±% |
|---|---|---|---|---|
| Liberal Democrats | Keith Lock | 1,183 | | |
| Liberal Democrats | Mollie Lock | 1,063 | | |
| Conservative | John Bull | 1,017 | | |
| Conservative | Ben Bovill | 928 | | |
| Turnout | | 4,191 | 54.1 | +15 |
| Liberal Democrats hold | | Swing | | |
| Liberal Democrats hold | | Swing | | |

Northcroft (2 seats)
| Party | Candidate | Votes | % | ±% |
|---|---|---|---|---|
| Liberal Democrats | Tony Vickers | 749 | | |
| Liberal Democrats | Gwen Mason | 712 | | |
| Conservative | John Tristam | 644 | | |
| Conservative | Charlie Farrow | 643 | | |
| Independent | David Yates | 342 | | |
| Independent | Lee Harris | 290 | | |
| Turnout | | 3,380 | 45.5 | |
| Liberal Democrats hold | | Swing | | |
| Liberal Democrats hold | | Swing | | |

Pangbourne
| Party | Candidate | Votes | % | ±% |
|---|---|---|---|---|
| Conservative | Pamela Bale | 742 | 82.8 | +8.6 |
| Green | Katherine Kennet | 56 | 6.3 | +6.3 |
| Liberal Democrats | Teresa Wareham | 50 | 5.6 | −10.3 |
| Labour | Robert Tutton | 48 | 5.4 | −4.5 |
| Majority | | 686 | 76.6 | +18.4 |
| Turnout | | 896 | 41.0 | +5 |
| Conservative hold | | Swing | | |

Purley on Thames (2 seats)
| Party | Candidate | Votes | % | ±% |
|---|---|---|---|---|
| Conservative | Tim Metcalfe | 1,272 | | |
| Conservative | David Betts | 1,261 | | |
| Liberal Democrats | Stephen Bown | 278 | | |
| Green | Miriam Kennet | 264 | | |
| Labour | Riyad Abboushi | 261 | | |
| Liberal Democrats | David Wood | 238 | | |
| Turnout | | 3,574 | 37.7 | +14 |
| Conservative hold | | Swing | | |
| Conservative hold | | Swing | | |

Speen (2 seats)
| Party | Candidate | Votes | % | ±% |
|---|---|---|---|---|
| Conservative | Paul Bryant | 1,336 | | |
| Conservative | Marcus Franks | 1,295 | | |
| Liberal Democrats | Chris Hood | 517 | | |
| Liberal Democrats | Sam Elliott | 488 | | |
| Turnout | | 3,636 | 44.2 | +5 |
| Conservative hold | | Swing | | |
| Conservative hold | | Swing | | |

St Johns (2 seats)
| Party | Candidate | Votes | % | ±% |
|---|---|---|---|---|
| Conservative | Mike Johnston | 1,269 | | |
| Conservative | Ieuan Tuck | 1,227 | | |
| Liberal Democrats | Malik Azam | 848 | | |
| Liberal Democrats | Cheryl McAlinn | 837 | | |
| Turnout | | 4,181 | 48.9 | +9 |
| Conservative gain from Liberal Democrats | | Swing | | |
| Conservative hold | | Swing | | |

Sulhamstead
| Party | Candidate | Votes | % | ±% |
|---|---|---|---|---|
| Conservative | Keith Chopping | 663 | 67.0 | +15.8 |
| Liberal Democrats | James Kerry | 326 | 33.0 | −15.8 |
| Majority | | 337 | 34.1 | +31.8 |
| Turnout | | 989 | 50.9 | +7 |
| Conservative hold | | Swing | | |

Thatcham Central (2 seats)
| Party | Candidate | Votes | % | ±% |
|---|---|---|---|---|
| Conservative | Richard Crumly | 818 | | |
| Conservative | Ellen Crumly | 793 | | |
| Liberal Democrats | Patrick Denys | 773 | | |
| Liberal Democrats | Alexander Payton | 720 | | |
| UKIP | Craig Sandelands | 127 | | |
| Green | Volker Heinemann | 110 | | |
| Turnout | | 3,341 | 39.9 | |
| Conservative gain from Liberal Democrats | | Swing | | |
| Conservative gain from Liberal Democrats | | Swing | | |

Thatcham North (2 seats)
| Party | Candidate | Votes | % | ±% |
|---|---|---|---|---|
| Liberal Democrats | David Rendel | 1,019 | | |
| Liberal Democrats | Lee Dillon | 920 | | |
| Conservative | Sheila Ellison | 904 | | |
| Conservative | Kay Smurthwaite | 854 | | |
| BNP | Andy Clasper | 119 | | |
| BNP | Jacqui Hunt | 113 | | |
| Turnout | | 3,929 | 49.7 | |
| Liberal Democrats gain from Conservative | | Swing | | |
| Liberal Democrats hold | | Swing | | |

Thatcham South and Crookham (2 seats)
| Party | Candidate | Votes | % | ±% |
|---|---|---|---|---|
| Liberal Democrats | Owen Jeffery | 898 | | |
| Liberal Democrats | Terry Port | 861 | | |
| Conservative | Peter Ellison | 817 | | |
| Conservative | Sandra Warham | 764 | | |
| Turnout | | 3,340 | 38.7 | |
| Liberal Democrats hold | | Swing | | |
| Liberal Democrats hold | | Swing | | |

Thatcham West (2 seats)
| Party | Candidate | Votes | % | ±% |
|---|---|---|---|---|
| Liberal Democrats | Keith Woodhams | 960 | | |
| Liberal Democrats | Jeff Brooks | 957 | | |
| Conservative | Rodney Arnold | 837 | | |
| Conservative | James Crumly | 797 | | |
| Turnout | | 3,551 | 37.2 | |
| Liberal Democrats hold | | Swing | | |
| Liberal Democrats hold | | Swing | | |

Theale
| Party | Candidate | Votes | % | ±% |
|---|---|---|---|---|
| Liberal Democrats | Alan Macro | 445 | 50.9 | +9.5 |
| Conservative | Ian MacFarlane | 300 | 34.3 | +0.5 |
| Labour | Terry Jackson | 102 | 11.7 | −13.0 |
| Green | Nicholas Foster | 27 | 3.1 | +3.1 |
| Majority | | 145 | 16.6 | +9.0 |
| Turnout | | 874 | 42.0 | +10 |
| Liberal Democrats hold | | Swing | | |

Victoria (2 seats)
| Party | Candidate | Votes | % | ±% |
|---|---|---|---|---|
| Liberal Democrats | Roger Hunneman | 609 | | |
| Liberal Democrats | Gabrielle McGarvey | 578 | | |
| Conservative | Brian Goodall | 504 | | |
| Conservative | Pearl Hancock | 425 | | |
| Independent | Philip Parry | 167 | | |
| UKIP | David McMahon | 97 | | |
| Turnout | | 2,380 | 35.1 | +5 |
| Liberal Democrats hold | | Swing | | |
| Liberal Democrats hold | | Swing | | |

Westwood
| Party | Candidate | Votes | % | ±% |
|---|---|---|---|---|
| Conservative | Laszlo Zverko | 460 | 64.4 | +23.7 |
| Liberal Democrats | Sid Sidamparappillai | 163 | 22.8 | −17.3 |
| Labour | Charles Croal | 91 | 12.7 | −6.5 |
| Majority | | 297 | 41.6 | +41.0 |
| Turnout | | 714 | 38.7 | +7 |
| Conservative hold | | Swing | | |

== By-elections between 2007 and 2011 ==
Thatcham South and Crookham by-election 22 July 2010
| Party | Candidate | Votes | % | ±% |
|---|---|---|---|---|
| Liberal Democrats | Robert Morgan | 936 | 54.3 | +2.0 |
| Conservative | Dominic Boeck | 787 | 45.7 | −2.0 |
| Majority | | 149 | 8.6 | |
| Turnout | | 1,723 | 34.0 | −4.7 |
| Liberal Democrats hold | | Swing | | |
