= Tonyrefail School =

Location
- Gilfach Road, Tonyrefail; Rhondda Cynon Taf, CF39 8HG
- Coordinates: 51.5819°N 3.4408°W

Information
- Opened: September, 1973
- Closed: September, 2018
- Age range: 11-19
- Enrollment: c. 1050
- Language: English

Tonyrefail School was an 11-18 mixed comprehensive school of approximately 1050 students that served the town of Tonyrefail and the surrounding areas.

The school was situated on the north side of the town of Tonyrefail, on the B4278 near Bryngolau, around three miles south of Tonypandy and about four miles west of Pontypridd. It took its pupils from a cluster of six primary schools, Abercerdin, Cwmlai, Hendreforgan, Tonyrefail, Tref-y-Rhyg, and Williamstown, and worked with other schools in Rhondda Cynon Taf to offer a range of post-16 courses at its Sixth Form Centre.

The school was closed in April 2019.

== History ==
Tonyrefail School opened as a new mixed comprehensive in September 1973, replacing a school on the site known as Tonyrefail Grammar School, a school built in 1931 which eventually closed in July 1973.

The school was closed as a result of the Rhondda Cynon Taf County Borough Council 21st Century Schools Reorganisation, which aimed to take a radically different approach to education in the area, by sharing both primary and secondary sector resources. At the end of the summer term, 2018, Tonyrefail School and Tonyrefail Primary School were both planned to close, and in September 2018 a new Tonyrefail Community School, for local children aged from three to nineteen, would open in new buildings which had been built at a cost of some £44 million on the school‘s site, including a Sixth Form Centre of Excellence. In the event, the new school was delayed and the outgoing schools did not close until the spring term of 2019.

== Notable former students ==
=== Tonyrefail Grammar School ===
- Boyd Clack (born 1951), actor
- Jeffrey John (born 1953), clergyman, Dean of St Albans
- Cliff Morgan (1930–2013), BBC broadcaster, Head of BBC Television Sport 1976-87
- Trefor Richard Morgan (1914–1970), Welsh nationalist

=== Tonyrefail School ===
- Corey Domachowski (born 1996), professional rugby player, prop for Wesh national team
- Matthew Rees (born 1980), professional rugby player, hooker for Welsh national team and the British & Irish Lions
