= 2000 West Berkshire Council election =

Local government election in England

The 2000 West Berkshire Council election took place on 4 May 2000 to elect members of West Berkshire Council in Berkshire, England. The whole council was up for election and the Liberal Democrats stayed in overall control of the council.

== Election result ==
West Berkshire local election result 2000
Party	Seats	Gains	Losses	Net gain/loss	Seats %	Votes %	Votes	+/−
Liberal Democrats	28			-9	51.9			
Conservative	25			+9	46.3			
Independent	1			0	1.9			

== By-elections between 2000 and 2003 ==
Burghfield by-election 9 May 2002
Party	Candidate	Votes	%	±%
Liberal Democrats		1,299	59.2	−9.5
Conservative		813	37.1	+5.8
Labour		82	3.7	+3.7
Majority		486	22.1	
Turnout		2,194	49.7	
Liberal Democrats hold		Swing		
