= West Berkshire Council =

Local authority in Berkshire, England

Type
- Type: Unitary authority

History
- Founded: 1 April 1974

Leadership
- Chair: Stephanie Steevenson, Liberal Democrats since 14 May 2026
- Leader: Jeff Brooks, Liberal Democrats since 9 May 2024
- Chief Executive: Joseph Holmes since 8 November 2024

Structure
- Seats: 43 councillors
- Political groups: Administration (28) Liberal Democrats (28) Other parties (15) Conservative (11) Green (2) Labour (1) Independent (1)
- Length of term: 4 years

Elections
- Voting system: Plurality-at-large
- Last election: 4 May 2023
- Next election: 6 May 2027

Meeting place
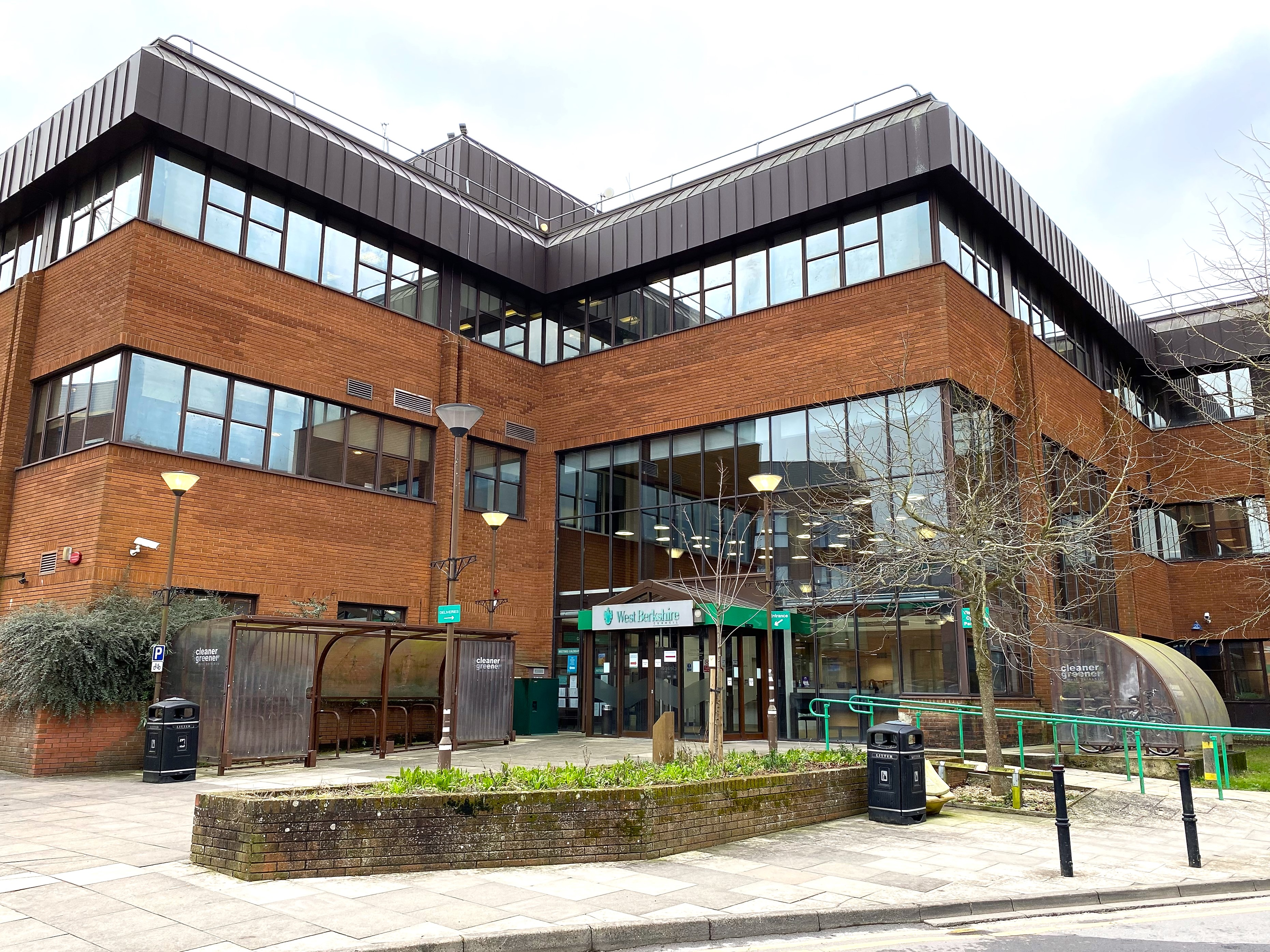
- Council Offices, Market Street, Newbury, RG14 5LD

Website
- www.westberks.gov.uk

West Berkshire Council is the local authority of West Berkshire in Berkshire, England. The council was created in 1974 as Newbury District Council, and was a lower-tier district council until 1998. The district was renamed West Berkshire on 1 April 1998 when the council became a unitary authority, being a district council which also performs the functions of a county council.

The council has been under Liberal Democrat majority control since 2023. It is based at the Council Offices in Newbury.

== History ==
=== Establishment ===
The council was formed on 1 April 1974 under the Local Government Act 1972 as the Newbury District Council. It replaced Bradfield Rural District Council, Hungerford Rural District Council, Newbury Borough Council, Newbury Rural District Council and Wantage Rural District Council.

From 1974 until 1998 Newbury District Council was a lower-tier district authority, with Berkshire County Council being the upper-tier authority for the area. In 1998 Berkshire County Council was abolished and the county's six districts became unitary authorities, taking over the functions of the county council within their respective areas. During the transition period the council decided to change the district's name from Newbury to West Berkshire with effect from 1 April 1998, being the same day the council became a unitary authority.

=== Legal issues ===
In 2018 (R (Faraday Development Ltd) v West Berkshire Council [2018] EWCA Civ 2532), the Court of Appeal ruled that in entering a development agreement with St. Modwen Properties to develop an industrial estate in Newbury, the Council had "effectively agreed to act unlawfully in the future". The disposal of the land in question was originally seen by the Council as a "land transaction" rather than a public works contract (but that position was surrendered in the Appeal submissions), and the opportunity to acquire the land was advertised so as to secure interested bids and "best consideration" in accordance with the Local Government Act 1972. The agreement allowed the developer the option to draw down land under a series of long leases, but if an option was taken up, the developer was contractually obliged to develop the site. The Court of Appeal, overruling the Administrative Court's judgment at first instance, held that such "contingent obligations" met the criteria for being considered a public works contract, whose procurement should have been undertaken in accordance with the full requirements of the Public Contracts Regulations 2015. The development agreement was ruled "ineffective" (quashed), the first time a decision of ineffectiveness was declared by English Courts against a Public Authority.

=== Possible merger ===
In July 2026, the UK Government confirmed that West Berkshire would become part of a new unitary authority known as Ridgeway Council, as part of the wider reorganisation of local government in Oxfordshire and West Berkshire. The new authority would combine the existing areas of West Berkshire, South Oxfordshire and the Vale of White Horse, replacing the current councils. The proposal was selected over alternative reorganisation models following a government consultation.

Under the implementation timetable, West Berkshire Council would continue to operate until 1 April 2028, when it would be abolished and its functions transferred to Ridgeway Council. Elections to a shadow authority were scheduled for May 2027, with the shadow council overseeing the transition before the new authority formally assumed responsibility in April 2028.

However on 7 September 2026, the government announced that a number of ongoing local government reorganisations, including the one affection West Berkshire, would be paused until the decision is "reviewed". Planned elections to the shadow authority will now not go ahead next year, with West Berkshire Council elections taking place instead. It is not clear if and when the proposed changes will go ahead.

== Governance ==
West Berkshire Council provides both district-level and county-level functions. The whole district is also covered by civil parishes, which form a second tier of local government.

=== Political control ===
The council has been under Liberal Democrat majority control since the 2023 election.

Political control of the council since 1974 has been as follows:

Newbury District Council

Party in control	Years
No overall control	1974–1976
Conservative	1976–1991
Liberal Democrats	1991–1998

West Berkshire Council (unitary authority)

Party in control	Years
Liberal Democrats	1998–2003
No overall control	2003–2005
Conservative	2005–2023
Liberal Democrats	2023–present

=== Leadership ===
The leaders of the council since 1999 have been:

Councillor	Party	From	To
Keith Lock	Liberal Democrats	1999	2001
Lena Rust	Liberal Democrats	2001	May 2003
Royce Longton	Liberal Democrats	2003	2005
Graham Jones	Conservative	10 May 2005	27 Sep 2012
Gordon Lundie	Conservative	27 Sep 2012	5 Nov 2015
Roger Croft	Conservative	5 Nov 2015	24 Mar 2017
Graham Jones	Conservative	9 May 2017	May 2019
Lynne Doherty	Conservative	21 May 2019	May 2023
Lee Dillon	Liberal Democrats	25 May 2023	30 Apr 2024
Jeff Brooks	Liberal Democrats	9 May 2024	

=== Composition ===
Following the 2023 election and a subsequent change of allegiance in October 2023, the composition of the council was:

Party	Councillors
Liberal Democrats	28
Conservative	11
Green	2
Labour	1
Independent	1
Total	43

The Greens, Labour and independent councillors sit together as the "Minority Group".

== Elections ==
Since the last boundary changes in 2019 the council has comprised 43 councillors representing 24 wards, which each ward electing one, two or three councillors. Elections are held every four years.

== Premises ==
The council's headquarters are the Council Offices on Market Street in Newbury. The building was purpose-built for Newbury District Council at a cost of £3.5 million and was completed in 1982.
