= Flags of cities, towns and villages in the United Kingdom =

The flags of cities, towns and villages in the United Kingdom lists the flags of locations in the United Kingdom that are registered by the Flag Institute. Towns and village flags are rare in the United Kingdom, but they are a very colourful addition to national vexillology. The Flag Institute has registered 45 city and village flags as of 2024.

A few towns and villages in the United Kingdom have created their own flags, often showing great ingenuity and artistry. The design of Finchfield in Staffordshire, for instance, exhibits a distinctive and appealing appearance that uses only one motif (three finches palewise) and a distinctively patterned division of the field that cleverly depicts ears of wheat. Flore in Northamptonshire has two motifs, a flower and a plum, but there is a great deal of symbolism between them. Not only is the flower a canting reference to the village name, but its stamen portrays a maypole pattern.

The UK Flags Registry of the Flag Institute is responsible for maintaining the definitive list of regional flags. Several city flags are included, which are in fact banners of the city councils' arms. However, town and village flags can differ significantly and are considered to be the property of the town and not its council.

The creation of village flags is a burgeoning phenomenon and a field of endeavour that merits encouragement. Despite the association of great cities with civic designs, the local flags of towns and villages typically originate from the smaller units of society, not from the bureaucracy. They opt for symbols that hold significance to the villagers or townsfolk.

== List ==
Flag	Place	County	Adoption	Description
	Appleby-in-Westmorland	Westmorland	24 October 2014	The 13th-century town seal is what inspired the apple tree displayed on the flag of Appleby-in-Westmorland. A gold tree appears on a blue field, representing a play on the town's name. The town's livery colours are blue and gold, taken from its grant of arms, and are taken from its grant of arms. On the flag of Westmorland, the same tree appears in gold. The status of Appleby as the county town of Westmorland is reflected in sharing this symbol.
	Belfast	Antrim	30 June 1890	A banner of arms of Belfast City Council. It shows a ship and a bell (refers to the name of the city), and a pile vair.
	Bexhill-on-Sea	Sussex	11 March 2020	This flag was designed in the late nineteenth century by the Town Colours Committee. The committee approved it on 29 July 1893, and it made its debut in the open later that year. The club's sporting colours are formed by Bexhill Rowing Club, using it on ceremonial occasions. Bexhill Heritage and Rother District Council supported the request for this registration.
	Birmingham	Warwickshire	23 July 2015	Main article: Flag of Birmingham An abstract representation of the letter B for Birmingham is created by two blue triangles joining together. Their hue hints at the city's place in the United Kingdom's waterways. The golden zigzag line that borders them forms an abstract vertical letter M. Symbolizing the Roman symbol for one thousand, this recalls Birmingham's sobriquet, the 'city of a thousand trades'. Closed lock gates on a canal are represented by the colour blue next to it. The overall layout represents both the historic arms of the Bermingham family and the current municipal council. The golden bull's head in the centre represents the Bull Ring, the city's geographical, economic, and historical centre.
	Bloxwich	Staffordshire	5 May 2017	A cross in black and green counterchanged represents the town's industry and green spaces on a white field. The Bloxwich flag's two symbols evoke memories of nearby gatherings, sports teams and local legends. The annual carnival and the tale of the Bloxwich Lion are evoked by the black lion. This animal escaped and went wandering around the town. The story of the lion is commemorated in the name of a local pub, the Romping Cat. The badge of the local football team also has a lion's head. The story of the local wishing tree is symbolized by the crossed central branches of the tree. The badge of the Bloxwich rugby team also features a tree.
	Bothwell	Lanarkshire	11 January 2025	The flag design is a stylised map of the town, with a central red sandstone castle and the River Clyde flowing to the west. White, blue and gold are the colours of Bothwell’s primary schools.
	Calne	Wiltshire	24 September 2009	The blue insect represents the River Marden, which winds its way through town. The green hoist evokes the surrounding countryside, with a white stripe representing the chalk beneath. The two colours are connected by a gold band. In 1774, Joseph Priestley discovered oxygen in Doctor's Pond.
	Cardiff	Glamorgan	26 August 1906	A banner of arms of Cardiff Council. A red dragon perches on a green mound in a white field. The flag of Glamorgan is entwined with a leek plant, and the dragon is holding it.
	Caterham	Surrey	20 November 2016	A green, yellow, and green band runs horizontally across a white field on the flag. Its sinuous line evokes racing stripes and Caterham hills and valleys, while its colours represent Caterham Cars, the sports car manufacturer founded in the town in 1957. There is a central circle that recalls the number decal of a racing car. Caterham's iconic cedar tree and its horizontal branches are stylised within this circle. Legend has it that this tree arrived in the community from Bethlehem.
	Coventry	Warwickshire	7 December 2018	BBC CWR organised a competition that saw the flag win. When Coventry is the UK City of Culture in 2021, it will fly proudly. Lady Godiva appears mounted in black on a broad white pale. She represents Coventry's long history and strong principles, as well as its modern vocation as a city of peace. She also represents Coventry's modern vocation as a city of peace. The sky blue panels on either side of the figure recall 'Coventry Blue,' a dye used in the historic local textile sector. This is, of course, the colour of Coventry City F.C., the famous 'Sky Blues'.
	Craig-y-dorth	Monmouthshire	24 September 2013	Craig-y-dorth, or the "hill of the loaf", is represented here by a red heraldic loaf within an inverted yellow triangle. There are two golden wyverns couchant facing each other as in battle on either side of the road. One is displayed on a blue background, while the other is displayed on a red background. There was a wyvern on the battle standard of Owain Glyndŵr, Prince of Wales. His army defeated troops of Henry IV at Craig-y-dorth in 1404, driving them back to Monmouth Castle. The blue of the flag represents the blue of the old Kingdom of Gwent, which also appears in the Flag of Monmouthshire. The red colour comes from Glyndŵr's battle standard.
	Cromford	Derbyshire	28 June 2016	The flag was designed in 2006, first flew in 2010, and has appeared throughout the village on festive occasions ever since. Cromford's international importance as the birthplace of the modern factory system is represented in the design with a stylised mill, millpond and wheel. The first factories in the world were the textile mills built here by Sir Richard Arkwright in 1771. Together with neighbouring mills in the Derwent Valley, they hold World Heritage Site status. The Cromford Flag's colours are similar to the county flag of Derbyshire. The coat of arms of Sir Richard Arkwright is reflected in them.
	Denny and Dunipace	Stirlingshire	28 May 2016	The town of Denny and Dunipace held a contest to pick a town flag for the first time in Scotland. There is a river Carron that separates and unites Dunipace and Denny. The twin towers of the castle remind us of the twin settlements. The castle also represents the river's name, which may originate from the Brythonic "caer avon". The eleven-pointed star is a representation of the eleven mills that stood here in the mid eighteenth century. The hues evoke the former municipal emblems, the white highlighting the significant agreements made here.
	Digbeth	Warwickshire	1 October 2015	The Digbeth Residents Association requested the registration of this flag, which first flew at the Digbeth Olympic Games in September 2010. The flag has three horizontal bands: light blue at the top, black at the centre, and white at the bottom. Digbeth's Irish heritage and the sky are represented by light blue, the ancient heraldic colour of Ireland. There are four white semicircles in the black band, reminiscent of the Victorian railway viaduct that ran through Digbeth. There are four black semicircles above the white band, evoking the viaduct reflected in the nearby canals. The ripples represent the river Rea, the birthplace of Birmingham, which now flows underground. Digbeth's role as a hub of the modern urban art scene is represented by audio speakers and music.
	Edinburgh	Midlothian	21 April 1732	A banner of arms of the City of Edinburgh Council. There is a black castle with three towers on a green and grey mound, all white. Each tower flies a red flag and has a red dome and dome. This depicts the Edinburgh Castle.
	Elstree and Borehamwood	Middlesex	1 October 2020	The town council sponsored a design competition won by Lily Saron. There is a black tree in silhouette against a green and yellow background, reflecting the towns rural surroundings and elements in the names of Elstree and Borehamwood. A yellow Saxon crown was added by the judges to symbolize the town's position at the intersection of two Anglo-Saxon kingdoms: Essex and Mercia.
	Embo	Sutherland	September 2025	The horizontal tricolour of red, gold and blue was first used on 16 July 1988, when the village issued a unilateral declaration of independence as the 'Independent State of Embo'. The anchor is a local landmark.
	Evenley	Northamptonshire	18 November 2014	Evenley's historic village green is represented by a vertical green stripe at the hoist. The village's rural setting is represented by three cowslips in gold and red. The cowslip is the county flower of Northamptonshire and thrives in the nearby hedgerows. There is gold in the rest of the field. Gold is the colour of Northamptonshire. The village's name is mentioned in it. Evenley is derived from the Old English Imley, Imnley and Evelai, which mean a flat clearing or the clearing of woodland. The gold field has a lance with a Saint George's pennant piercing a green dragon. The church in the village is named after this.
	Finchfield	Staffordshire	19 June 2010	There are three goldfinches on the flag, which helped give the town its name. They are displayed at the hoist to indicate their importance. Finchfield's original fields are yellow, and its modern parks and environment centre is green. The local schools have yellow and green colours as well. There is a double significance to the vertical line that divides them. The link between past and present is shown by the traditional importance of agriculture to the town.
	Flore	Northamptonshire	12 March 2012	The purple and gold field is divided by a wavy diagonal, evoking the river Nene that winds through the village. Gold represents the crown of the May Queen and the warmth of the community. The shade of purple reflects the abundance of fruit trees in the area. The fruit is the indigenous 'Flore Plum,' reputedly brought here from Damascus by the Romans. The village has a Roman site on the south side. The plum blossom represents the goddess Flora, and the original name of the village is 'Flower'. A bird's-eye view of the maypole that's part of the floral celebration recalls the flower's curved petals. The maypole is a badge of the local primary school.
	Four Elms	Kent	28 June 2016	A yellow saltire is displayed on the flag. The saltire reflects the situation of the village at a notorious crossroads between Edenbridge and Sevenoaks, oriented northeast, southeast, southwest, and northwest. The hues indicate the lushness of Kent in general and Four Elms in particular. The local cricket club has its colours. Four elm leaves recall the trees that gave the village its name, in the centre of the design.
	Girvan	Ayrshire	2 August 2025	The flag shows the distinctive shape of Ailsa Craig which lies off the shore of the town. It was designed by a local schoolgirl, chosen in a competition in 2025, and first raised at the town's Arts Festival on 2 August 2025
	Hampton Poyle	Oxfordshire	3 July 2014	The flag is the banner of arms of Walter de la Poyle, which is the basis of the flag. In the 13th century, the de la Poyle family acquired the manor of Hampton and eventually adopted their surname. The arms and flag have golden discs that represent gold coins brought home from the crusades. A crusader was Walter de la Poyle. He is shown in knight's armour and with hands crossed on his stone effigy in St Mary's Church, further supporting this theory.
	Heathfield	Sussex	5 April 2016	The flag features the black and green hues of the nearby rugby team and secondary school. Both the Cuckoo Railway and Waldron Ghyll, which cut through the town, are represented by the white bend. The annual Heffle Cuckoo Fair has been held in Heathfield since 1315. There are insignia of the local scouts, football club, and parish council on the Gibraltar Tower. The flag's top right corner shows the tower's position east of town, looking down on the buildings below. A key referencing the flag of Gibraltar is displayed on the tower.
	Horningsea	Cambridgeshire	29 April 2014	There's a white and red field on the flag. A potter's wheel is depicted in the centre. The village sign in Horningsea was adorned with this emblem in 1982, and the residents' association uses it as their emblem. The Romans had a lot of kilns here to use the grey clay in the area, and they sent the finished pots by boat to Peterborough. The pots continued across the Roman Empire, including Pompeii, where a Horningsea pot is reputed to be on display. Occasionally, residents find whole pots and shards of pottery. There's a swallowtail version of this flag that flies around town. It's worth noting that Horningsea has an event flag as well as its village flag since 2014. The Hospital of Saint John the Evangelist, now St John's College, Cambridge, was granted the parish by the Bishop of Ely in 1214. The 800th anniversary of this historic event is commemorated in the flag. The red field with gold highlights Lady Margaret Beaufort, the founder of Saint John's College. Within it is the bird shown on the Hospital's waxed seal, over the crossed keys of Saint Peter.
	Kingswinford	Staffordshire	15 July 2011	A crowned boar on a blue field is used to symbolize the town's name and origins. The age of the town is represented by a boar with a Saxon crown. A river fording by a boar completes the allusion to the town's name in the blue field. Kingswinford sports a blue hue, and stags have been spotted in local lore.
	City of London	Middlesex	17 April 1381	Main article: Flag of the City of London A banner of arms of the City of London Corporation. A red cross of Saint George, with the sword of Saint Paul in the canton for the patron saints of England and London.
	Marden	Herefordshire	23 June 2019	Hope and kingship are represented by the flag's colours of green and gold. The upper celestial crown represents Æthelberht II, an eighth-century king of East Anglia who was brutally murdered in 794 on the orders of King Offa of Mercia. Legend has it that Offa's palace was located at Sutton Walls in the Marden parish, and the alleged murder took place there. The sword in the centre represents the weapon used to decapitate the king, and the Saxon crown below represents Offa. The river Lugg at Marden was where the murderers disposed of Ethelbert's mutilated body. Visitors to the Marden Church and Community Fete on 23 June 2019 chose the flag after voting between several shortlisted designs. Liz Roberts' flag was the winner, with a huge margin.
	Maryhill	Lanarkshire	2 October 2021	A narrow boat on the Forth and Clyde Canal is represented by James Hodgson's modern take on a traditional tricolour. The spectacular Kelvin Aqueduct was opened at Maryhill, which led to the founding of the town. Two bands of blue represent the canal and the river Kelvin. Red alludes to community passion, while black represents Maryhill's industrial past. Red and black are the colours of Maryhill F.C. The flag also references the boat-on-aqueduct motif from the unofficial Maryhill 'coat of arms' (1885) Maryhill Burgh Halls organised a year-long contest to choose the winning flag, which involved hundreds of individuals, schools and community groups. A panel of experts from the Flag Institute and the Court of the Lord Lyon then picked a shortlist of five to put to public vote. Judges included Jane McCarry as well. Being part of such a great community project has been an honour, she said. It was an absolute pleasure to be on the judging panel because of the number of fantastic flags. Wishing all the winners good luck! Maryhill’s annual Gala Day celebrations took place on 2 October 2021, when the winning flag was raised for the first time.
	Monmouth	Monmouthshire	31 July 2015	The golden Monnow Bridge symbolizes the iconic crossing over the river Monnow. Monmouth is a historically significant crossing into Wales, represented by the green above, which is the same shade as the flag of Wales. The gatehouse of Monmouth, offset from the hoist for visibility, is depicted above the Monnow Bridge.
	Nenthead	Cumberland	11 May 2014	The green triangle issuing from the hoist has two significances. The name of the village is evoked by its representation of the crest of the Nent valley. The same green as the flag of Cumberland references Knowbury Hill, the easternmost point in the historic county of Cumberland. The eight-pointed star of Quakerism adorns the green triangle, recalling the town's origins. There are hoops in black and white (argent) below the triangle. These are the traces of lead and silver that fuelled Nenthead and laid the groundwork for its business.
	Newbury	Berkshire	14 July 2013	Upper right is Newbury Castle, which was besieged by King Stephen in 1152. It was reputedly located in the Wharf area of the town, although no evidence of this survives. Three domed towers have been shown in various depictions since 1599. A teasel evokes a famous name and trade in Newbury's history. The most considerable clothier England ever beheld, Jack O'Newbury, used teasels in wool-combing and cloth finishing. The rich agricultural history of the Newbury area is symbolized by a wheat sheaf in the lower left. The town dealt in horses, cattle, and cheese, and constructed a Corn Exchange in 1862 to handle its substantial grain trade. Two crossed basket-hilt mortuary swords mark the two Civil War battles that took place in and around Newbury. These took place around Wash Common and Enborne, as well as Shaw and Speen. The river Kennet is represented by the wavy blue line in the centre of the flag. It was an important crossing point from the earliest times and later became a significant river and canal port.
	Newton Abbot	Devon	2009	A stylised image of St Leonard's Tower in the centre of a modified flag of Devon. The green represents the moors, the black the granite and the white the clay of the surrounding area. The cross is also used to represent a major crossroads in the town, which converged on the clock tower. The arms of the cross represent the routes to Exeter and London, Bovey Tracey and the moors, Totnes and Plymouth, and Torquay and Brixham.
	Penkhull	Staffordshire	7 July 2018	There are strong ties to the Spode family in Penkhull, a hilltop village and conservation area within the city limits of Stoke-on-trent. The village was developed as a dormitory suburb by Josiah Spode, who lived close to his famous Spode pottery works. A golden saltire nowy is charged with a blue oval bearing a golden rooster. There is a rural feel to the green field. The saltire recalls the crossroads at its heart, while the central oval represents classic Spode tableware. A feature of the village is the weather vane of St Thomas's Church, which the rooster draws on. The Penkhull Mysteries event saw this winning design fly for the first time after being chosen by popular vote.
	Penrith	Cumbria	9 November 2012	This concept is based on the ancient Penrith seal. This brass seal may date back to 1223, when Henry III gave Penrith a market charter. It vanished during Scottish raids in the 14th century, but resurfaced five centuries later during construction work near the church. The seal is in the Penrith and Eden Museums. The saltire refers to St Andrew, the patron saint of the community. The strong connection to Scotland recalls the turbulent past of the area. It was under English and Scottish rule until 1237, when it fell under English and Scottish rule again. Scotland claimed it until 1295 and continued to dispute it until 1603. A red saltire on a white background creates a striking visual representation. A small souvenir pot made by Goss before 1914 serves as an example. The red saltire recalls the light of the traditional Penrith beacon, stretching out. The flag, designed by Philip Tibbetts, a resident at the time, was submitted for registration by the Penrith Civic Society. It received support from a public poll in the local newspaper and also received support from a public poll.
	Petersfield	Hampshire	28 December 2008	Crossed keys on a green field with a plain white and wavy blue hoop. The crossed keys refer to the town’s patron saint, Saint Peter. Following a competition in the Petersfield Post, the people of Petersfield chose their flag.
	Pewsey	Wiltshire	18 September 2014	There are dark green hills that represent the rural farming landscape. Upon the hills appears the Pewsey White Horse, which stands over the village. There's a gold rim on white and a crown of green oak leaves. The crown represents Alfred the Great, who owned land in Pewsey and whose statue can be found in the village's centre. The solidity of the village is represented by the oak leaves.
	Poole	Dorset	31 March 2020	There are design elements in the flag that are traced back to a 14th-century town seal. The College of Arms confirmed the arms during a heraldic visitation in 1563. Poole Harbour and its maritime life are represented by the wavy black and gold bars. The dolphin is the king of the sea. The patron saint of Old Poole's parish church is Saint James, represented by three scallop shells. Many of the pilgrims who sailed from Poole were represented by them.
	Portland	Dorset	14 April 2010	The colours represent the landscape of the area: Portland stone, grass and the sea. The white tower represents the castles and the naval coronet shows the long connection with the Royal Navy.
	Portsmouth	Hampshire	1194, 1622, 1686 (Flag or Banner of arms)	A crescent of gold on a shade of azure, with a blazing star of eight points. Portsmouth's original 1194 arms are based on those used by King Richard I and William de Longchamp, who granted Portsmouth its town charter in 1194. Portsmouth's arms predate the College of Arms, but were confirmed by Heraldic visitations in 1622 (by John Philipot) and in 1686 (by Henry St George, the younger).
	Preston	Lancashire	22 March 2012	The flag's colours are white and navy blue. The colour white refers to the club's nickname, the Lilywhites. Navy blue stripes evoke the traditional strip of Preston North End F.C. and the Preston Grasshoppers R.F.C. (shirts) A thin white gap separates the navy blue stripes into two crosses. Preston is a hub of Lancashire's motorway and railway networks, which are represented by these. The two crosses combine to form a larger cross, evoking Preston's religious roots, its name derived from 'Priest Town'. The cross is adorned with the Lamb of St Wilfrid, the patron saint of Preston.
	St Anne's-on-the-Sea	Lancashire	17 November 2012	The golden waves on a deep blue sea represent St Anne's famous sandy beach, sea views, and backdrop of sand dunes. The white lifeboat displayed towards the hoist represents the 'Laura Janet,' who was lost in the biggest disaster in the RNLI history. The town's maritime heritage and bravery and sacrifice are represented by it. The area's original name, 'West End,' is recalled by sitting the boat towards the hoist. Before becoming a separate parish in the late 19th century, it formed the western part of the ancient parish of Lytham before becoming a separate parish in the late 19th century.
	St Asaph	Denbighshire	5 December 2022	The basis of the flag is the diocesan arms, two white crossed keys on a black background, probably chosen to represent Asaph and Kentigern, two saints involved in founding the monastery here in the sixth century. This device was first documented by the College of Arms in 1512, although it also appears on earlier seals of Bishop Robert Lancaster dating from 1411 to 1433. The bishop simply added the yellow stripes from the kit of St Asaph City F.C. to form a simple and striking design because the people of St Asaph already used this device widely. The black and yellow colours also reflect those of the St David's flag. The St Asaph City Council decided to commemorate the tenth anniversary of the granting of city status by adopting a suitable flag in 2022. Rt Rev Gregory Cameron, Bishop of St Asaph, a confessed flag enthusiast, was asked to design it by the Council. The last round £1 coin and the first Christmas special £20 coin were designed by Bishop Cameron.
	Staining	Lancashire	18 May 2013	The Staining Windmill tower is now a Grade II listed building. It was built by a retired ship captain in 1715 and continued to produce grain until 1923. The sails still work, even though it was converted into a dwelling in 1980. Staining's Plough Inn is represented by the plough, which resembles the sculpture that adorns the pub's exterior. The original farmhouse was granted a liquor licence in 1810, and it's now an integral part of village life. The five crenellations of St Luke's Church tower are represented by five white rectangles that split the flag diagonally. The centre of the flag features a blue cross of St Luke (or Celtic cross) The main colour of the flag is blue, which is used by Staining School and Staining Juniors F.C.
	Thame	Oxfordshire	July 2017	The flag results from a competition held in the town. It incorporates Thame Town Council’s colours with part of the town’s emblem on the left hand side, and three waves – which signify the countryside, the Phoenix Trail and the River Thame – on the right hand side.
	Tywyn	Merionethshire	18 May 2013	The field of yellow and blue represents Tywyn beach and sea, which attract thousands of visitors each year. There is a wavy diagonal that divides the field. Tywyn's situation on the west coast of Wales is reflected in the left-facing emblems of a raven and a dolphin. John Corbett of Droitwich (1817–1901) had a raven as his family crest. The mid-19th century saw the arrival of Corbett in the area, and his generosity enriched Tywyn in numerous ways. The seafront promenade and many buildings that he adorned with the Corbett raven were funded by him. Tywyn locals have come to accept the raven as an emblem of their town, and these buildings often survive today. The dolphin naiant represents the bottlenose dolphins that frequent the Tywyn coast in summer. To the delight of both locals and visitors, they rely on the protection of Cardigan Bay to care for their children.
	Wadhurst	Sussex	25 September 2019	There's a rural feel to the green field on the flag. A golden-orange section, forming a 'W' for Wadhurst, recalls the historic iron industry and the hue of nearby waters. It also represents the hills, steep valleys, and meandering streams of the surrounding High Weald. The 'W' has three estoiles (wavy stars) that are derived from the Courthope arms. The Courthope family owned the Whiligh Estate, which covered much of Wadhurst. The oak used for Westminster Hall's famous hammer-beam roof was produced by this estate.
	Willenhall	Staffordshire	14 June 2014	There are a lot of references to the Willenhall's old trade, making locks and keys. The colours blue, red, and gold are from the arms of the former Willenhall Urban District Council. A red stripe at the hoist displays three gold padlocks, while the blue fly shows gold crossed keys and crown above. A red stripe at the hoist also displays three gold padlocks. A vertical embattled line divides the two, representing the pins of a locking mechanism. The town became a king of lock making after Elizabeth I granted permission to Willenhall to manufacture royal locks.
	Wing	Buckinghamshire	30 April 2013	John Hall designed this flag in 1987. Its colours, blue and gold, relate to the Dormer and Rothschild families. The manor of Wing was owned by the Dormers from the 1400s until the Earl of Chesterfield disposed of it in 1840. Meanwhile, the Rothschild family became prominent in the village in the 19th century and remain the major landowners in the area. Wing's Saxon heritage is reflected in the flag's golden arch. The church is the oldest surviving structure in the parish and is one of the UK's oldest religious institutions. The Dormer family was responsible for keeping the King's Falcons for several generations. They were close to the royal family because of this role. The church has restored tombs of the Dormers, and a falcon can be seen at the foot of the tomb of Sir William Dormer.
	Wreay	Cumberland	24 April 2015	Wreay's lush surroundings by the River Petteril are reflected in the green field, while its bold faith is reflected in the yellow cross. A silver bell from the village's past and two crossed pipes in the canton signify the local institution of the Twelve Men of Wreay. The upper fly quarter was adorned with pipes and bell in the late 1980s. They moved to the canton to improve their visibility before registration in 2015. The South Pole has seen a Wreay flag flying. It is in the pub now, and is officially stamped as proof of the feat.
	Wroxton	Oxfordshire	5 March 2009	The flag consists of a red cross surrounded by white on blue. There are a hawk, a leaf, a pickaxe and a duck all covered in white. There were four flags designed by local residents that were chosen by the people of Wroxton.
