= Hannah Aldworth =

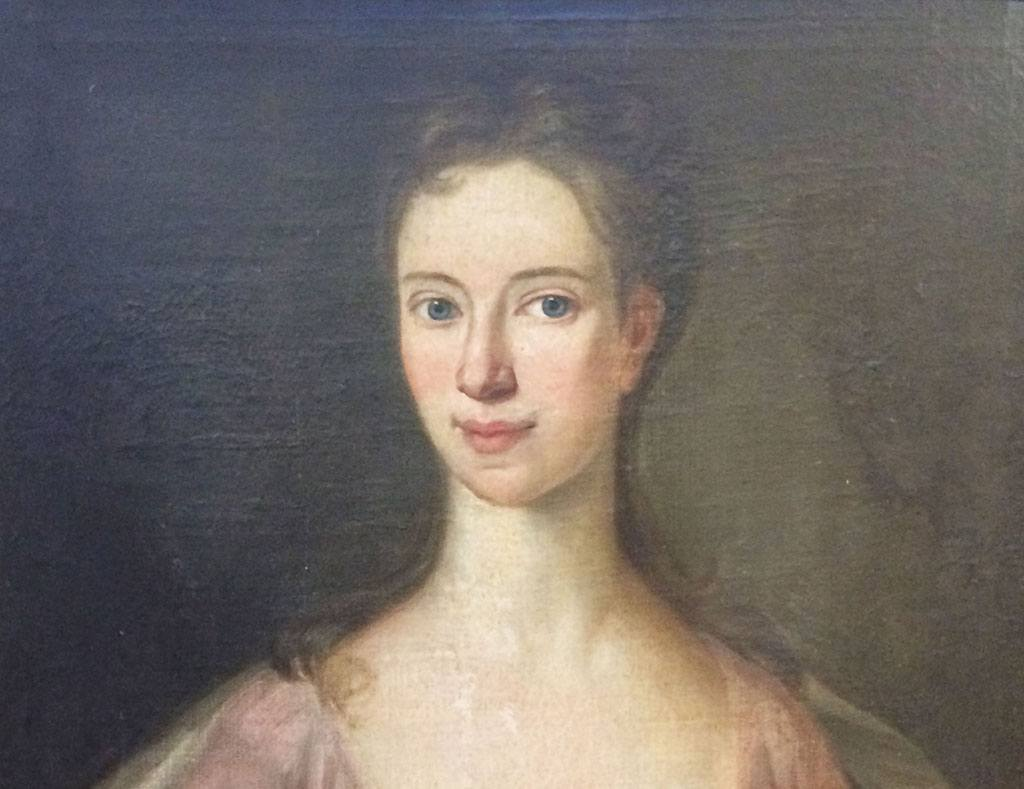
- Hannah Aldworth. Artist unknown. Photograph courtesy of St Nicolas Newbury PCC & Foundling Museum.
- Died: 1778
- Known for: Philanthropy

Hannah Aldworth (died 1778) was an English philanthropist and inspector in charge of supervising the care of foundling children in the Newbury area of Berkshire for the Foundling Hospital in London.

== Early life ==
Aldworth was one of the daughters of Samuel Slocock, a prosperous brewer in the Newbury area.

== Career ==
From around 1759 to 1768 Aldworth supervised the care of children by nurses in her local area as an inspector, a voluntary yet important role to the Foundling Hospital's operation and the expansion of care for foundling children in the eighteenth century. A married woman named Naomi Southby, thought to be Hannah's sister, seems also to have been an inspector, a connection which reflects the shared role of women inspectors amidst familial and social networks.

Kathleen Palmer asserts that the involvement of women like Aldworth "in the business of an organisation with national reach, on equal terms with their male counterparts, was unprecedented".

Aldworth's will indicates that she left £800 to endow parish almshouses. She died "greatly and deservedly respected".

== Legacy ==
Aldworth's portrait now hangs in the St Nicolas Church in Newbury.
