= William Courthope =

William Courthope may refer to several people of the Courthope family:

- William Courthope (MP) for Hastings (UK Parliament constituency)
- William Courthope (officer of arms) (1808–1866), English genealogist and herald
- William John Courthope, writer and historian
