= Corn Exchange, Newbury =

Municipal building in Newbury, England

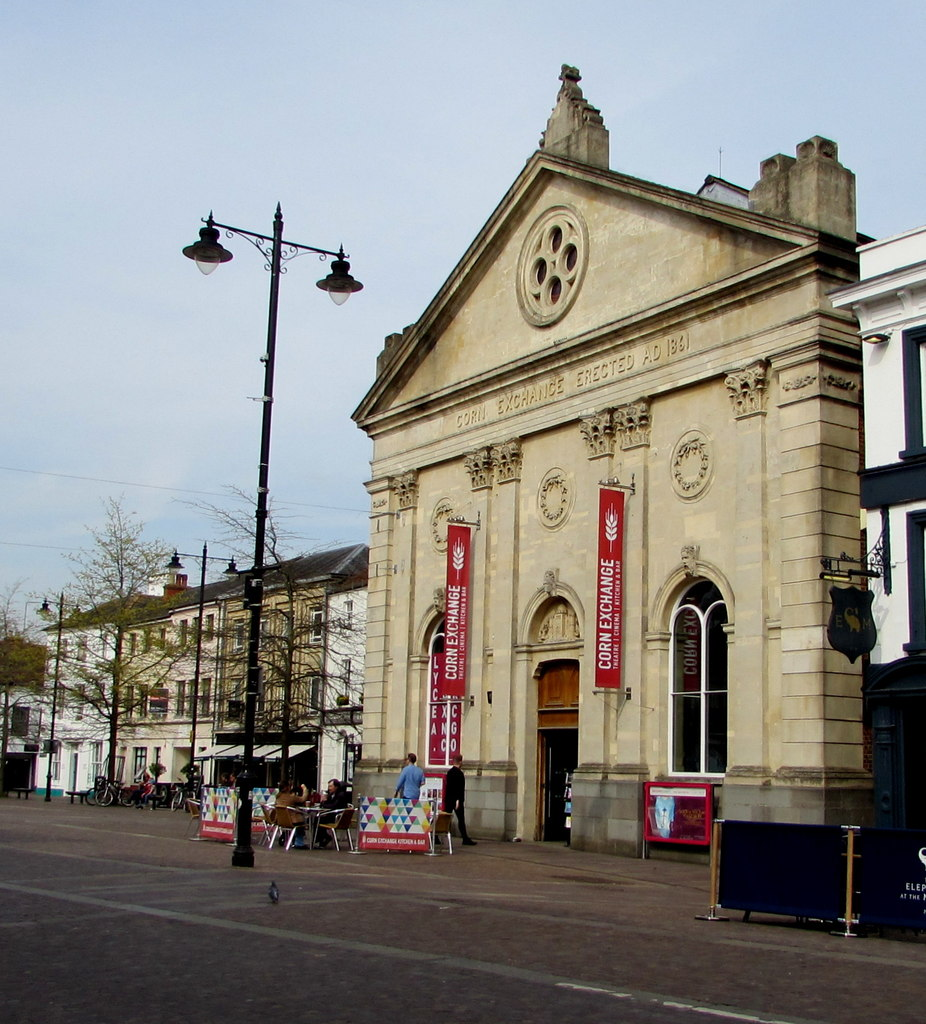
- Corn Exchange, Newbury

- Shown in Berkshire
- 51.4006°N 1.3230°W
- Location: Market Place, Newbury

History
- Built: 1862

Site notes
- Architect: James Dodd
- Architectural style: Neoclassical style
- Website: cornexchangenew.com

Listed Building – Grade II
- Official name: Corn Exchange
- Designated: 10 June 1969
- Reference no.: 1210588

The Corn Exchange is an events and concert venue located in the Market Place in Newbury, Berkshire, England. The structure, which was commissioned as a corn exchange and is now used as an events venue, is a Grade II listed building.

== History ==
The first location where merchants could trade in agricultural products in Newbury was a guildhall in the Market Place which was completed in 1611. After becoming very dilapidated and an obstruction to traffic, it was demolished in 1828.

The current building was designed by James Dodd in the neoclassical style, built in ashlar stone at a cost of £6,000 and was officially opened on 4 June 1862. The design involved a symmetrical main frontage of three bays facing onto the Market Place. The central bay featured a round headed doorway with an archivolt and a keystone while the outer bays were fenestrated by round headed windows with archivolts and keystones. All three bays were decorated by paterae above the openings and were flanked by pairs of Corinthian order columns supporting an entablature and a pediment with a quatrefoil in the tympanum. Internally, the principal room was a full-height assembly hall.

In the late 19th century, many important celebrations took place in the corn exchange. A promenade concert was held there on 10 March 1863 to celebrate the marriage of the Prince of Wales to Princess Alexandra. A reception was held there on 26 August 1879 to celebrate the cutting of the first sod on the Didcot, Newbury and Southampton Railway by Catherine, Countess of Carnarvon, and a public dinner was held there on 12 April 1882 to celebrate the opening of the railway by Lady Loyd-Lindsay.

The use of the building as a corn exchange declined significantly in the wake of the Great Depression of British Agriculture in the late 19th century. The building became an events and concert venue in the mid-20th century and, in May 1966, performers included the band, The Who: there was a serious disagreement when Keith Moon and John Entwistle came in late to a performance to see bandmates Pete Townshend and Roger Daltrey playing with members of a support act. Moon suffered a black eye and an injured leg in the ensuing melee.

Trading in corn finished completely in 1983 and, following a refurbishment costing £3.5 million, the building re-opened in September 1993. An independent charity, the Corn Exchange (Newbury) Trust, took over management of the building in June 2000.

== See also ==
- Corn exchanges in England
