= St Nicolas Church, Newbury =

Coordinates: 51.401°N 1.325°W

St Nicolas Church
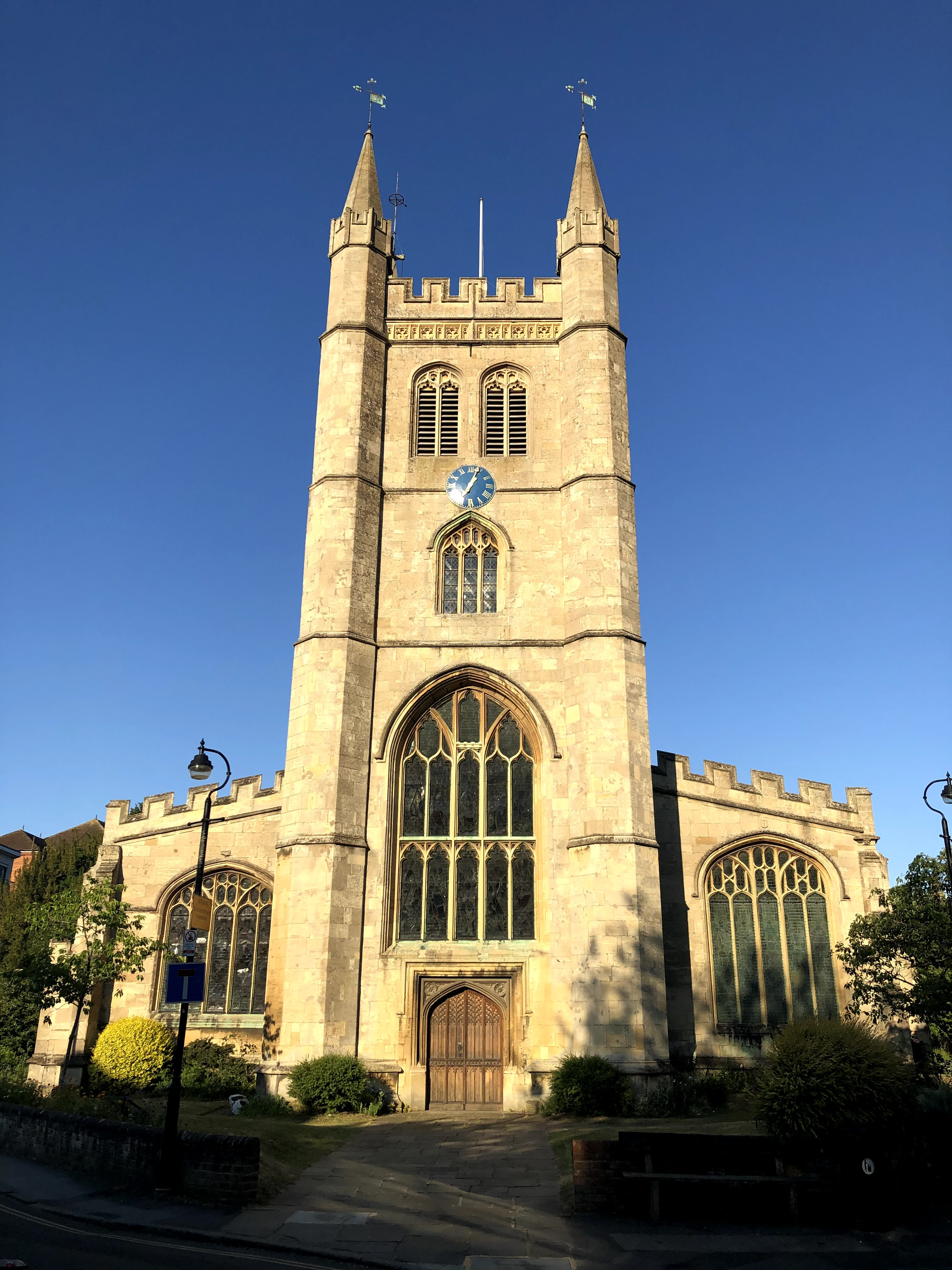
- St Nicolas Church
- Location: Newbury
- Country: England
- Denomination: Church of England
- Website: www.st-nicolas-newbury.org

History
- Founded: 1086
- Dedication: Saint Nicolas

Architecture
- Functional status: Active
- Style: Gothic

Administration
- Diocese: Oxford
- Archdeaconry: Berkshire

Listed Building – Grade I
- Reference no.: 1219556

St Nicolas Church is the Church of England parish church of Newbury, Berkshire, and stands just south of the main bridge over the River Kennet, in the centre of the town. The Grade I listed building is chiefly remarkable for the consistency of its Perpendicular Gothic architectural style and its unusually large size for a parish church.

It remains a lively and active church with a congregation of around 260.

== History ==
St. Nicolas Church is dedicated to the eponymous Bishop of Myra in the fourth century. A church was first built in this site during Norman times, and it is mentioned in a document of 1086 in which Ernulf of Hesdin gives the church of the Abbey of Préaux.

The present parish church was entirely rebuilt, probably between the years 1509 and 1533. It is in the architectural style of the late Perpendicular period. The presence of certain devices in the stonework, in particular the pomegranate device (the apple of Grenada) and the portcullis device (which appears on the Tudor royal escutcheon) indicates that the church was built during the marriage of Henry VIII and Catherine of Aragon, which ended in divorce in 1533.

In Fuller's History of the Worthies of England, published in 1663, it is stated: "John Winchcombe, commonly called Jack of Newbury... built the church of Newbury, from the pulpit westward to the tower inclusively, and died about the year 1520".

Although the church was extensively restored by the Victorians, they made no major structural alterations. It was designated as Grade I listed in 1950.

== Architecture ==
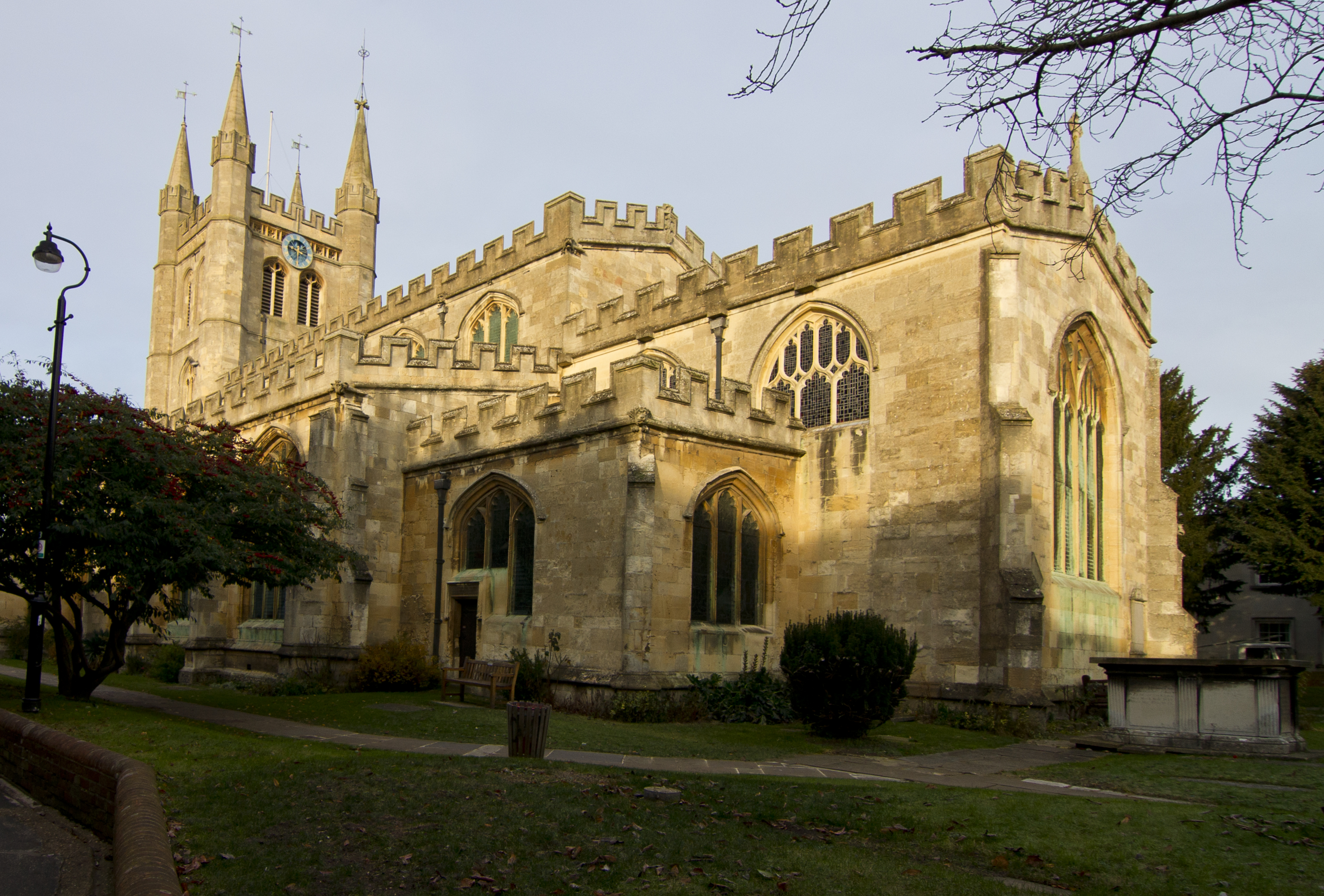
View of church from graveyard

The plan of the church is typical for a parish church, consisting of nave and chancel with no transept. Considered large compared to other churches of the same style, the nave has a clerestory, lighted by five large three light windows on either side, and aisles with arcades of five arches each. These aisles open into what were chantry-chapels on either side of the chancel. The southern chantry-chapel still has that role, but the northern is used as a vestry and contains the organ.

The west tower has a peal of ten bells and a Sanctus bell. The back eight bells date from 1803 and were cast from the now defunct Wells of Aldbourne bell foundry; they were re-hung in 1933 with new fittings and were augmented from 8 to 10. The front two date from 1933 and were cast by Mears & Stainbank of Whitechapel Road, London. The tenor bell, which weighs 21-2-1 (1093 kg), is in the note of D.

The stained glass windows date from the Victorian restoration by Henry Woodyer as do the external crenellations along the roof-line, and the pinnacles and turrets of the tower. The stained glass windows installed for this restoration were manufactured by Hardman & Co., the largest number being designed by John Hardman-Powell with some later ones designed by Donald Taunton. There is a Jacobean pulpit dating from 1607.

== Today ==
The church continues to play a central role in both the Christian and wider community of Newbury, fulfilling its purpose as an Evangelical Anglican parish church of Biblical preaching and worship. It has a congregation of around 260. A tune entitled 'Newbury' is a traditional English melody adapted for the hymn 'Jerusalem, thou city blest' (New English Hymnal 228).
