= Newbury, Berkshire =

Market town in West Berkshire, England

Coordinates: 51.401°N 1.323°W

Newbury
- Market town
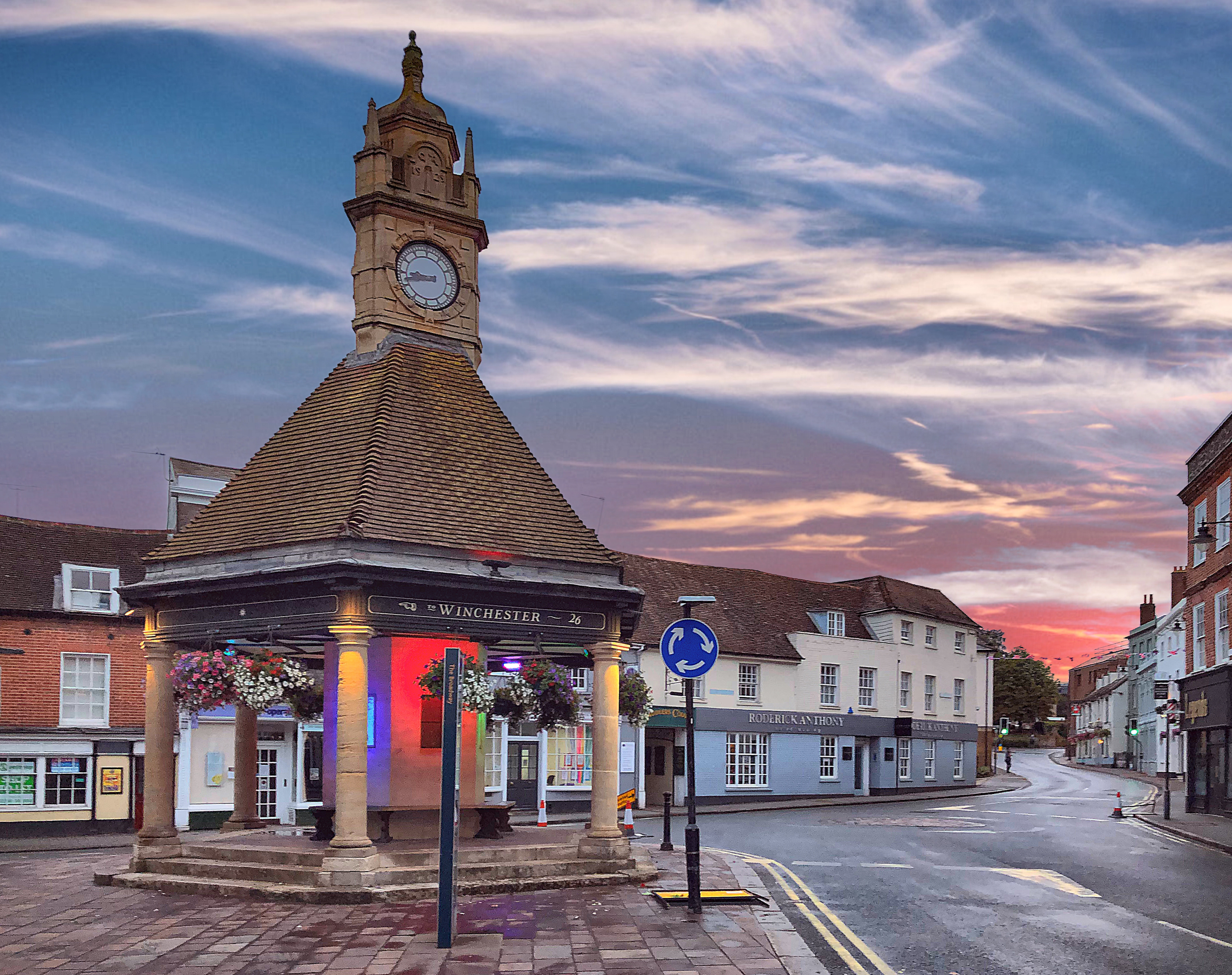
- Newbury clock tower at sunset in 2018

- Flag

- Location within Berkshire
- Area: 9.9 km^{2} (3.8 sq mi)
- Population: 33,841 (Parish, 2021); 42,260 (Built up area, 2021)
- OS grid reference: SU4767
  - London: 60 mi (100 km)
- Civil parish: Newbury
- Unitary authority: West Berkshire
- Ceremonial county: Berkshire
- Region: South East
- Country: England
- Sovereign state: United Kingdom
- Post town: NEWBURY
- Postcode district: RG14
- Dialling code: 01635
- Police: Thames Valley
- Fire: Royal Berkshire
- Ambulance: South Central
- UK Parliament: Newbury

Newbury is a market town in West Berkshire, England, in the valley of the River Kennet. It is 26 miles (42 km) south of Oxford, 25 miles (40 km) north of Winchester, 27 miles (43 km) southeast of Swindon and 20 miles (32 km) west of Reading. It is also where West Berkshire Council is headquartered.

Newbury lies on the edge of the Berkshire Downs, part of the North Wessex Downs Area of outstanding natural beauty, 3 miles (5 km) north of the Hampshire–Berkshire county boundary. In the suburban village of Donnington lies the part-ruined Donnington Castle and the surrounding hills are home to some of the country's most famous racehorse training grounds (centred on nearby Lambourn). To the south is a narrower range of hills including Walbury Hill and a few private landscape gardens and mansions, such as Highclere Castle. The local economy is inter-related to that of the eastern M4 corridor, which has most of its industrial, logistical and research businesses close to Newbury, mostly around Reading, Bracknell, Maidenhead and Slough. Together with the adjoining town of Thatcham, 3 miles (5 km) distant, Newbury forms the principal part of an urban area of approximately 70,000 people.

Newbury is also home to Newbury Racecourse, as well as being the location of the headquarters of Vodafone. The town centres around a large market square and retains a rare medieval Cloth Hall, an adjoining half timbered granary, and the 15th-century St Nicolas Church, along with 17th- and 18th-century listed buildings.

== History ==
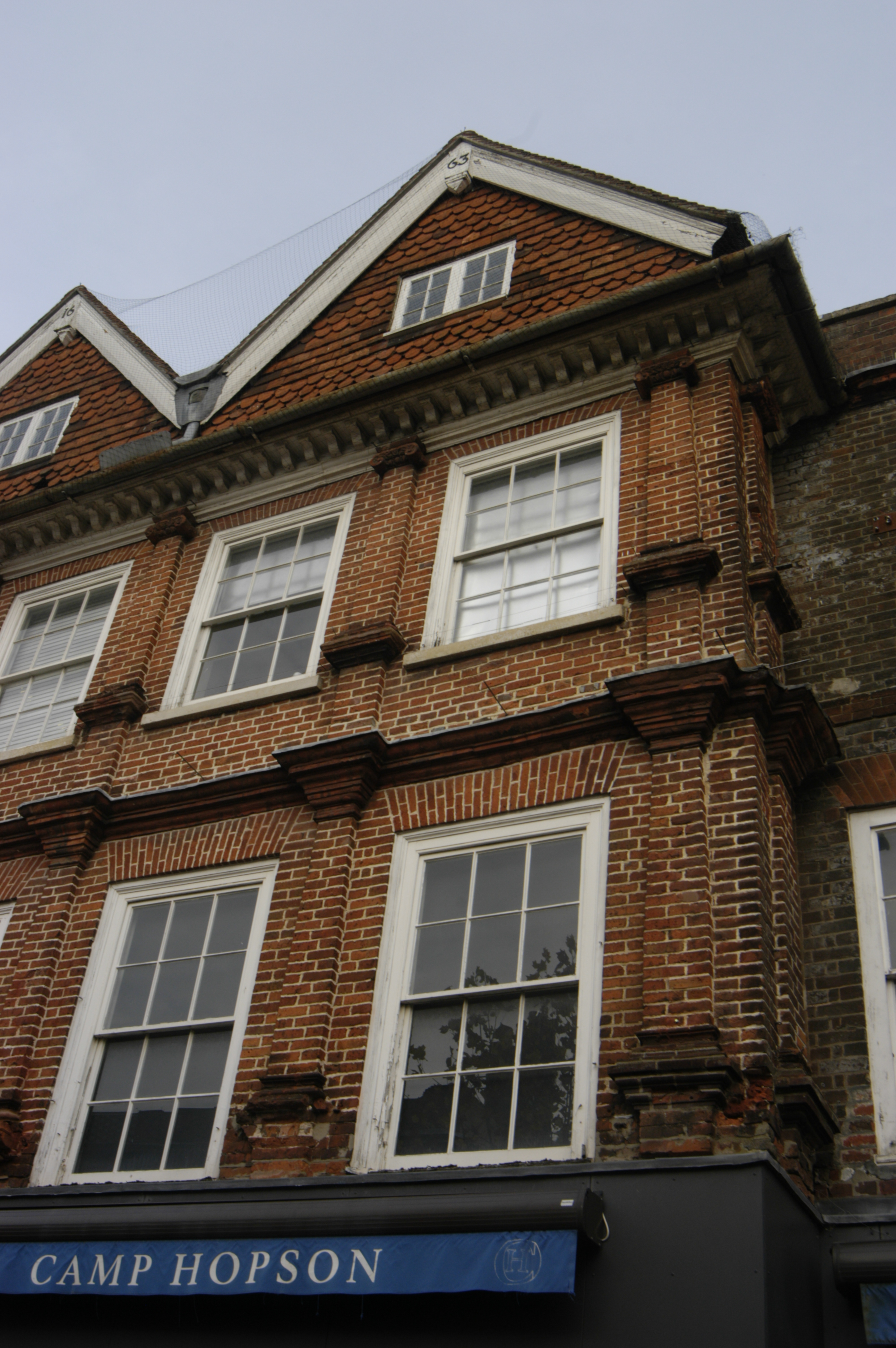
Part of the facade of Camp Hopson of Newbury, dating from 1663 with classical brick pilasters, in 2014.

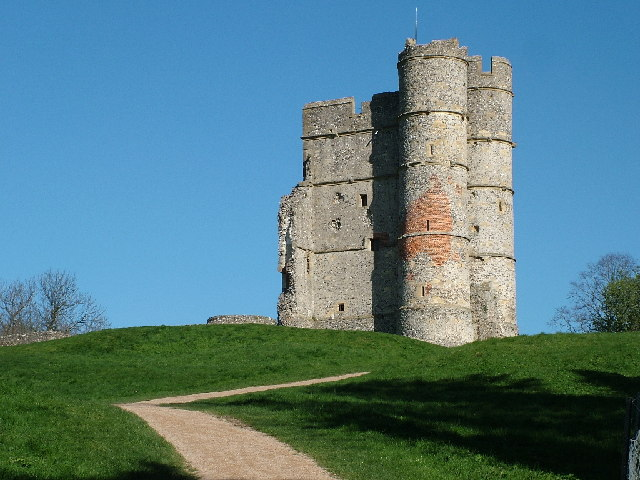
Donnington Castle

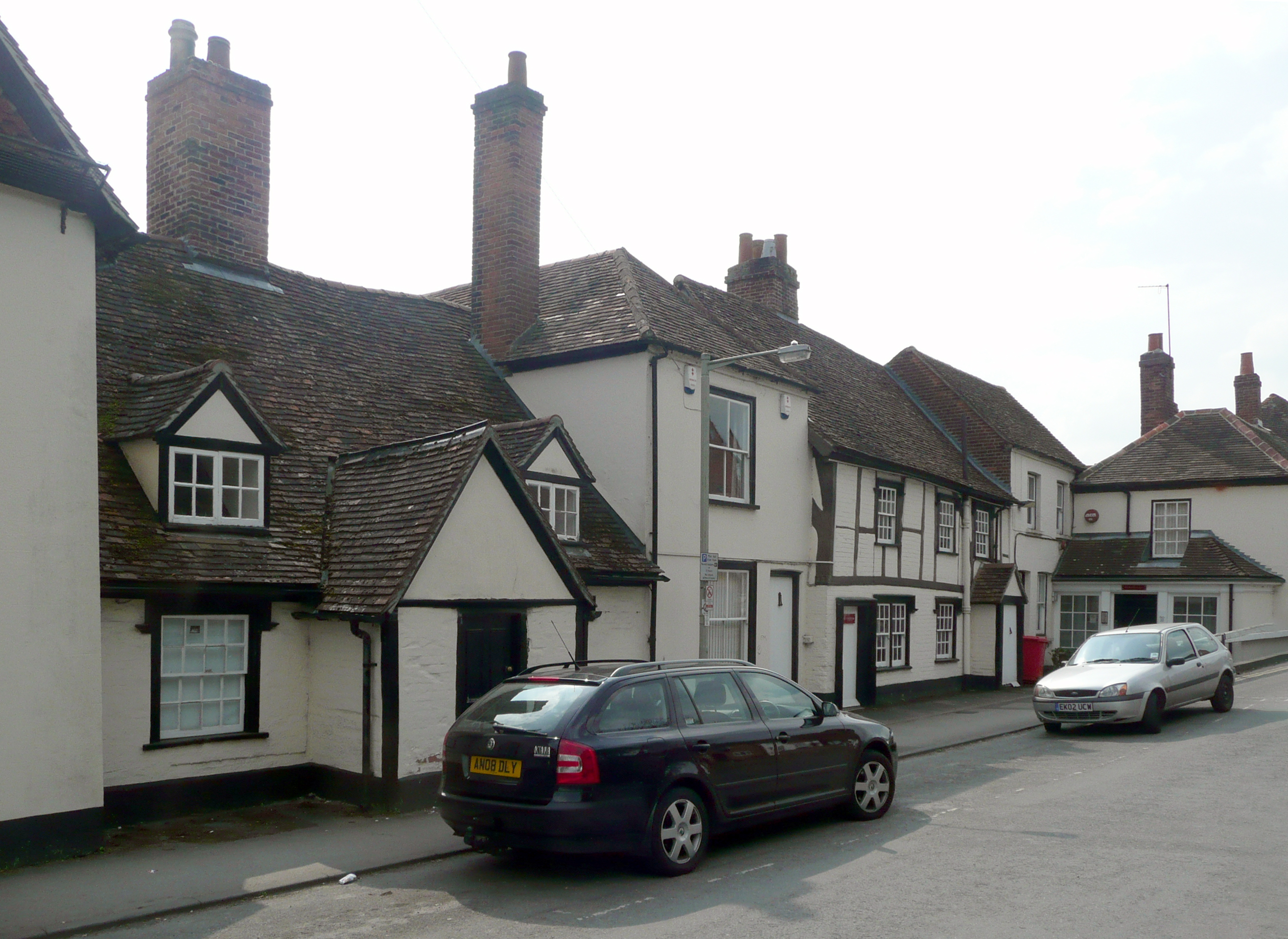
17th century almshouses

There was a Mesolithic settlement at Newbury. Artefacts were recovered from the Greenham Dairy Farm in 1963, and the Faraday Road site in 2002. Additional material was found in excavations along the route of the Newbury Bypass. Newbury was founded late in the 11th century following the Norman conquest as a new borough, hence its name. Although there are references to the borough that predate the Domesday Book it is not mentioned by name in the survey. However, its existence within the manor of Ulvritone is evident from the massive rise in value of that manor at a time when most manors were worth less than in Saxon times. In 1086 the Domesday Book assesses the borough as having land for 12 ploughs, 2 mills, woodland for 25 pigs, 11 villeins (resident farmhands, unfree peasant who owed his lord labour services), 11 bordars (unfree peasants with less land than villans/villeins), and 51 enclosures (private parks) rendering 70s 7d.

Doubt has been cast over the existence of Newbury Castle, but the town did have royal connections and was visited a number of times by King John and Henry III while hunting in the area. The first reference to a bridge on the site of the current Newbury Bridge is an account of its reconstruction in the 14th Century. In 1312, King Edward II directed that its bridge should be kept in good order. By 1623, when the bridge collapsed, it was recorded as being built of wood, being 30 feet (9 metres) in length and 20 ft (6 m) in width, and having shops on it. The bridge was presumably rebuilt, as it is recorded that in 1644 a guard was placed on the bridge.

Historically, the town's economic foundation was the cloth trade. This is reflected in the person of the 16th-century cloth magnate, Jack of Newbury, the proprietor of what may well have been the first factory in England, and the later tale of the Newbury Coat. The latter was the outcome of a bet as to whether a gentleman's suit could be produced by the end of the day from wool taken from a sheep's back at the beginning. The local legend was later immortalized in a humorous novel by Elizabethan writer Thomas Deloney. Newbury was the site of two battles during the English Civil War, the First Battle of Newbury (at Wash Common) in 1643, and the Second Battle of Newbury (at Speen) in 1644. The nearby Donnington Castle was reduced to a ruin in the aftermath of the second battle. The disruption of trade during the civil war, compounded by a collapse of the local cloth trade in the late 16th century, left Newbury impoverished.

The local economy was boosted in the 18th century by the rise of Bath as a popular destination for the wealthy escaping London's summer heat and associated stench. Newbury was roughly halfway between London and Bath and an obvious stopping point in the two-day journey. Soon Newbury, and the Speenhamland area in particular, was filled with coaching inns of ever increasing grandeur and size. One inn, the George & Pelican, was reputed to have stabling for 300 horses. A theatre was built to provide the travellers with entertainment featuring the major stars of the age. In 1795 local magistrates, meeting at the George and Pelican Inn in Speenhamland, introduced the Speenhamland System which tied parish poor relief (welfare payments) to the cost of bread.

In 1723, the Kennet Navigation made the River Kennet navigable downstream from Newbury to the River Thames in Reading. Some 70 years later, in 1794, work started on the centre section of the Kennet and Avon Canal, which would extend the Kennet Navigation to Bath, thus providing a through water route between London and Bristol via Newbury. This route was finally completed in 1810. The opening of the Great Western Railway from London to Bath in 1841 effectively killed the canal and coaching trades, and as the line passed some 25 kilometres (15 1/2 mi) to the north it brought no advantage to the town. Newbury had to wait until 1847 to join the railway network, with the opening of the Berks and Hants Railway branch line from Reading to Hungerford via Newbury, and until 1906 to be on a main line, with the opening of the Reading-Taunton line. As a result, Newbury became something of a backwater market town, with an economy based largely on agriculture and horse-racing. The last use of the stocks in Newbury, and probably the UK, was on 11 June 1872 when Mark Tuck was placed in them for 4 hours. In the 1980s, British electronics firm Racal decided to locate their newly formed telecommunications company Racal Vodafone, later Vodafone UK, in the town. In the subsequent decades Newbury became something of a regional centre for the high-tech industries, and the town has since enjoyed a return to general economic prosperity.

=== Greenham Common ===
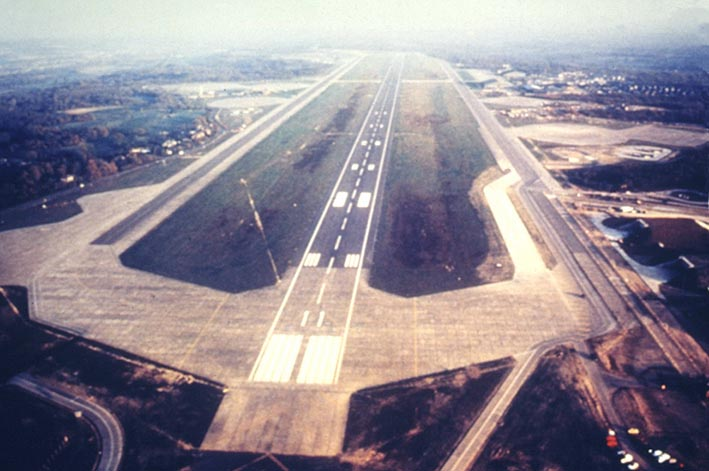
Greenham Common in the late 80s

A large Royal Air Force station was established during the Second World War in 1942 at Greenham Common on the edge of the town. In the 1950s, it became home to US Air Force bombers and tankers, for which it was equipped with the longest military runway in the United Kingdom. In the 1980s, it became one of only two USAF bases in the UK equipped with ground-launched nuclear-armed cruise missiles, causing it to become the site of protests by up to 40,000 protesters and the establishment of the Greenham Common Women's Peace Camp. With the end of the Cold War, the base was closed, the runway was broken up, much of it used as fill material in building the Newbury bypass, and the area was restored to heathland. This project then saw Greenham and Crookham commons reopened to the public in 2000.

=== 1943 bombing ===
On 10 February 1943, two German bombers, Dornier Do 217s from ll/KG40 Bomber unit in Holland, on a nuisance raid, followed the Great Western Railway line running west from London. One of the bombers headed towards Reading while the other followed the line all the way to Newbury. At 4:43pm the bomber dropped eight high-explosive bombs over the town. There had been no time for a warning siren. The Senior Council School, St. Bartholomew's Almshouses, St. John's Church (just the altar was left standing) and Southampton Terrace were all destroyed, and another 265 dwellings were damaged, many of which had to be demolished. St John's Church was completely rebuilt after the war. 15 people were killed and a further 41 people were injured, 25 seriously.

== Government ==
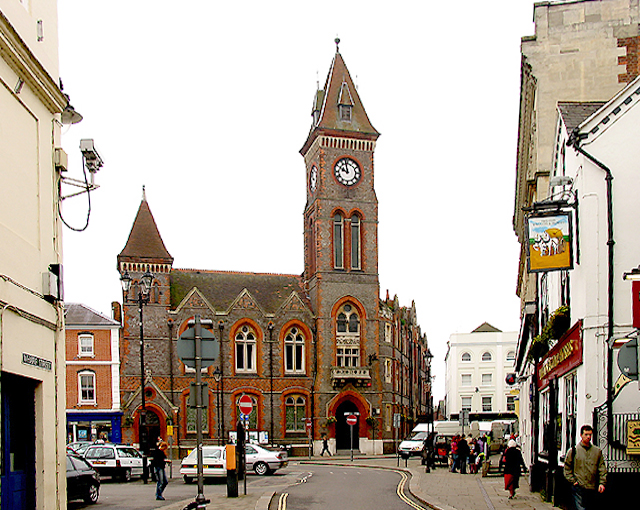
Newbury Town Hall, completed in 1881

There are two tiers of local government covering Newbury, at parish (town) and unitary authority level: Newbury Town Council and West Berkshire Council. The town council is based at the Town Hall in the Market Place. West Berkshire Council is also based in the town, having its headquarters on Market Street.

Newbury Town Council currently has 23 councillors, representing seven wards of the town, currently: Brummel Grove, Clay Hill, Falkland, Northcroft, Pyle Hill, Victoria and St Johns. In the 2023 United Kingdom local elections, the Liberal Democrats retained control of the town council, with 21 councillors elected, alongside 2 Green Party councillors.

Coat of arms of Arms of Newbury Town Council
Notes Granted to the borough council on 24th June 1948. Crest On a Wreath Or and Azure a Castle of three Towers domed Gules flying from the centre tower a forked Pennant Argent charged with a Bar wavy Azure and from the exterior towers a Flag also Azure. Escutcheon Gules on a Fesse Argent between in chief a Teazle Flower between two Garbs and in base as many Swords in saltire points upwards Or a Bar wavy Azure. Motto Floruit Floreat

In the House of Commons, the town is in the Newbury constituency. Since the General Election of July 2024 this constituency has been represented by Lee Dillon, a Liberal Democrat. From 1999 to 2020 Newbury was part of the South East England European Parliament constituency electing MEPs by proportional representation.

=== Administrative history ===
Newbury was an ancient borough. Its date of incorporation as a borough is unknown; the name implies it was founded as a borough, and the earliest known documentary reference to it explicitly being a borough is from 1189. The earliest known municipal charter was granted in 1596. The borough covered the same area as the parish of Newbury. It was reformed to become a municipal borough in 1836 under the Municipal Corporations Act 1835, which standardised how most boroughs operated across the country.

The municipal borough and parish of Newbury were abolished in 1974 under the Local Government Act 1972, becoming part of the larger Newbury district. The Newbury district councillors who represented the area of the former borough then acted as charter trustees to preserve the town's mayoralty and civic traditions, in the absence of the town having its own town council.

In the mid-1990s, the government decided to abolish Berkshire County Council and pass its functions to the county's six district councils, including Newbury District Council. Ahead of the change coming into force, the district council decided to establish a new parish of Newbury, and also to change the district's name to West Berkshire. The new parish of Newbury and its town council were established in 1997. Newbury District Council took over county-level functions from the abolished county council and was renamed West Berkshire Council on 1 April 1998.

=== Twin towns ===
The twinning ceremonies were held at the Corn Exchange. Newbury is twinned with the following:

- Braunfels in Germany (1963)
- Bagnols-sur-Cèze in France (1970)
- Eeklo in Belgium (1974)
- Feltre in Italy (2003)
- Carcaixent in Spain. (2019)

== Geography ==
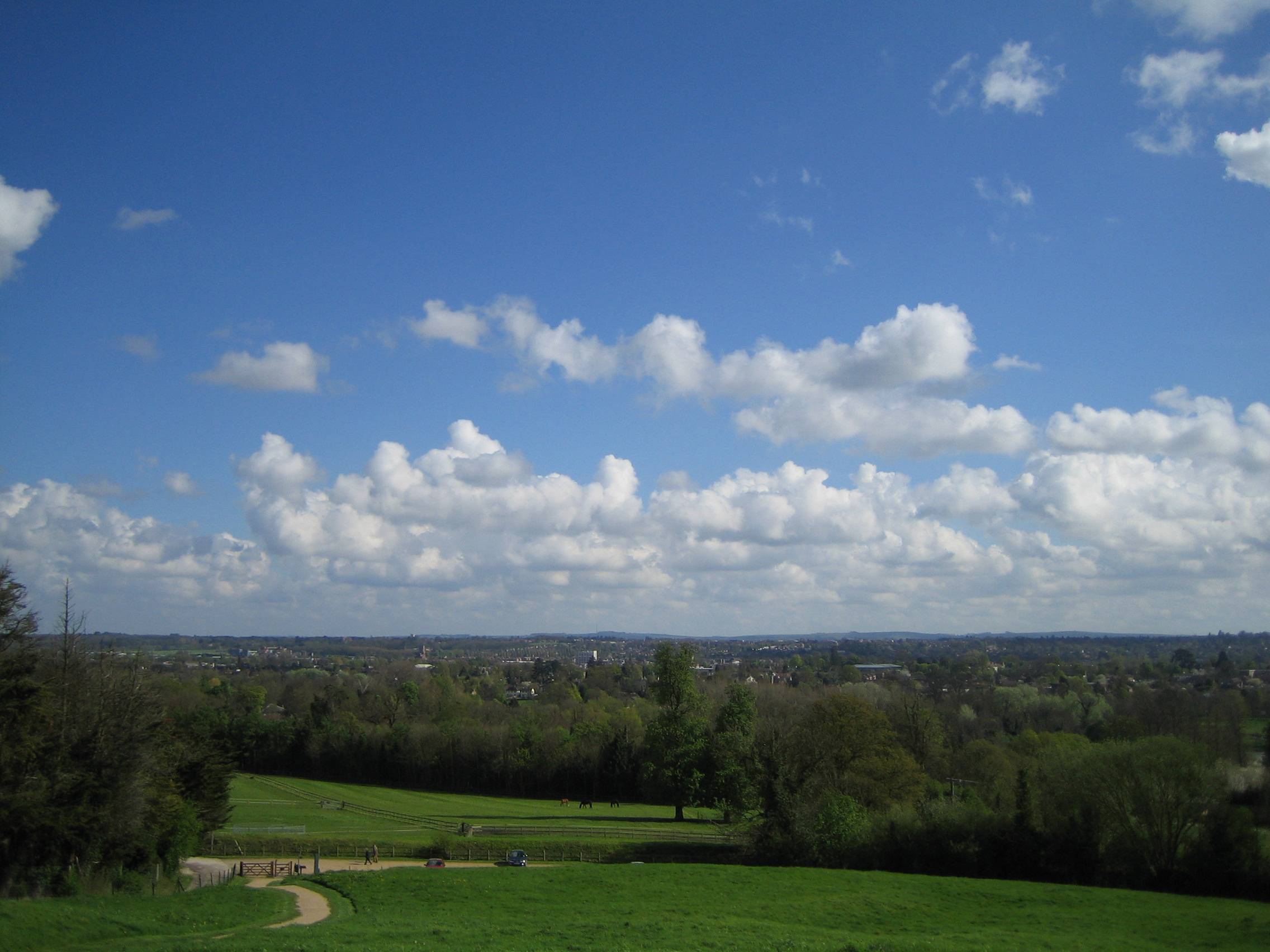
View of Newbury and surroundings from Donnington Castle

The Civil Parish of Newbury consists of the town and the suburbs of Wash Common, The City, West Fields, East Fields and Speenhamland. The modern conurbation of Newbury, however, with close bus and road links and almost contiguous development, may be taken to include the surrounding villages of Speen, Donnington, Shaw and Greenham. Speen, which is now a suburb of western Newbury, is roughly equidistant between Bristol and London.

Elevations vary from a minimum of 72 m above mean sea level to 122 m at Wash Common. Elevations reach 150–200 m in the directly adjoining hills. The River Kennet and the Kennet and Avon Canal flow east through the centre of the town to reach the Thames at Reading, while the River Lambourn (beside which is the country's largest horse-training paddocks in the Valley of the Lambourn Downs) partly forms its northern boundary, ending in the town. A tributary that is smaller still, the River Enborne, forms the southern boundary (and also the county boundary with Hampshire).

Adjoining the town's south-eastern border is Greenham Common and the famous Newbury Racecourse. Newbury is surrounded on three sides (north, west and south) by the North Wessex Downs. The downland to the south rises steeply out of the river valley providing scenic views, including Watership Down (made famous by the novel of the same name), Beacon Hill, the southeast's highest point Walbury Hill, and Combe Gibbet.

== Demography ==
Newbury has two very narrowly buffered settlements, Thatcham (25,267 inh. as at 2011) and Shaw cum Donnington (1,686 inh. as at 2011) forming an identifiable, informal greater Newbury urban and suburban conglomeration. In major use classes 11% of Newbury's land is occupied by roads and as of 2005, 34% of its land was occupied by domestic gardens.

2011 Published Statistics: Population, home ownership and extracts from Physical Environment, surveyed in 2005
Output area	Homes owned outright	Owned with a loan	Socially rented	Privately rented	Other	km^{2} roads	km^{2} water	km^{2} domestic gardens	Usual residents	km^{2}
Civil parish	3816	4549	2589	2464	133	1.146	0.189	3.430	41075	9.9

== Economy ==
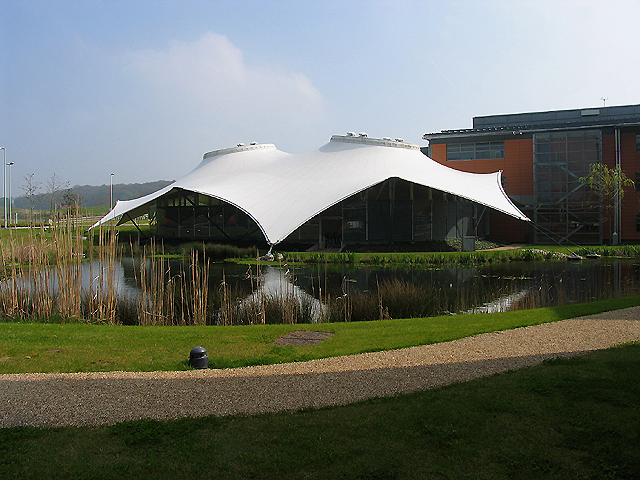
Part of the Vodafone Headquarters

Newbury and its immediate surroundings constitute the major commercial and retail centre of West Berkshire. The local economy is inter-related to that of the eastern M4 corridor which has most of its industrial, logistical and research businesses close to Newbury, Reading and Slough, with smaller industrial estates in the county at Theale, Bracknell and Maidenhead. Newbury is home to the United Kingdom headquarters of the mobile network operator Vodafone, which is the town's largest employer with over 6,000 workers. Before moving to their £129 million headquarters in the outskirts of the town in 2003, Vodafone used 64 buildings spread across the town centre.

As well as Vodafone, Newbury is also home to the United Kingdom headquarters of National Instruments, Stryker Corporation, EValue, and the Newbury Building Society. The pharmaceutical company Bayer AG are also headquartered in the town, although in October 2015 the company announced their intention to move to the Green Park Business Park near Reading.

== Transport ==
=== Rail ===
Newbury is served by two railway stations, Newbury and Newbury Racecourse, both on the Reading to Taunton line. Great Western Railway operates services from both stations. The town was also served by the Didcot, Newbury and Southampton Railway until its closure in the 1960s.

=== Road ===
Following a similar east–west route is the A4 road from London to Bristol, historically the main route west from London. This road has been superseded as a long-distance route by the M4 motorway which runs almost parallel and can be accessed three miles (five kilometres) to the north at the Chieveley interchange at Junction 13. At Newbury this east–west route is crossed by a dual-carriageway north–south trunk road, from the major south coast port of Southampton to the industrial centres of the Midlands. Although this route was once served by the Didcot, Newbury and Southampton Railway, today it is only served by the A34 road, which now bypasses Newbury to the west on an alignment partially using the old rail route (see also 'Newbury Bypass' below).

Until the completion of the bypass, the A34 and A4 met in the town centre at the Robin Hood Roundabout, a complicated gyratory system encompassing 6 approaching roads, a fire station, ambulance station and an exit on the inside of the roundabout, which has a north–south flyover across the roundabout. In 2007, the sculpture Couple in Conversation was unveiled on the roundabout, providing a new landmark for one of the major gateways into the town. Other significant roads radiating from Newbury include the A339 which now includes the renumbered part of the old A34 through the town centre and then heads towards Basingstoke and the M3 motorway, the A343 to Andover, the B4000 to Lambourn, the B4494 to Wantage and the B4009 to Streatley.

==== Bus services ====
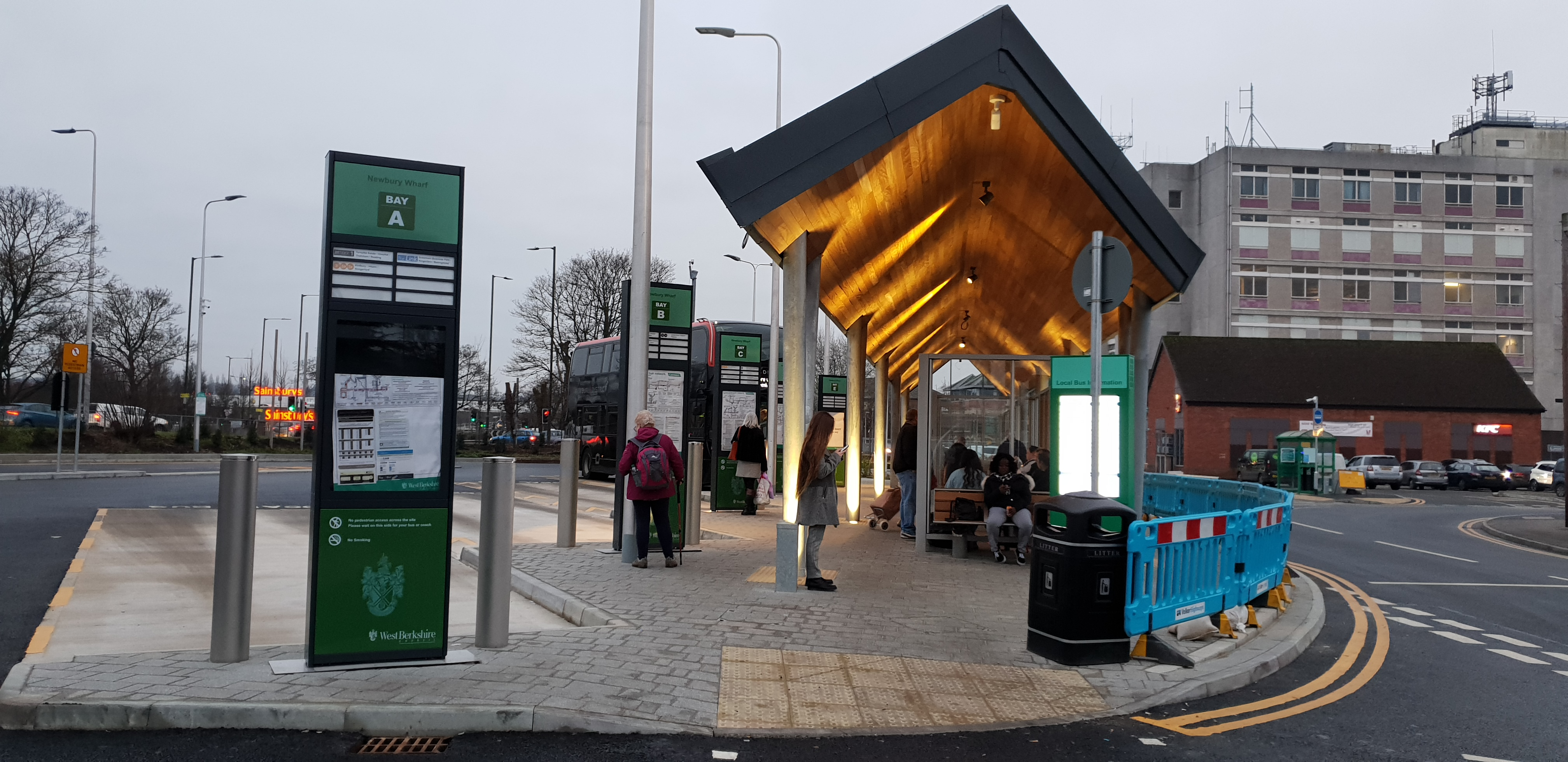
Newbury's New Bus Station

Newbury Buses, a division of Reading Buses, provided most local bus services in the area until August 2011. Reading Buses still serves the area under the Newbury & District brand

Reading Buses operates the 'jet black' 1 route to Thatcham, Theale and Reading.

Stagecoach South operates route 32 (formerly the 'Link') to Kingsclere, North Hampshire Hospital and Basingstoke.

Thames Travel operates routes X24 and X34 to Harwell Campus and Didcot.

Swindon's Bus Company operates route X20, a once-weekly 'shopper' service from Marlborough and Hungerford.

Stagecoach South operated services 7 and 7A to Woolton Hill and Andover until 30 August 2025, when funding cuts resulted in their cancellation.

National Express previously served Newbury, most recently in 2022, with route 402 to Reading's Mereoak Park & Ride, Heathrow Airport and London, under contract to Newbury & District.

==== Newbury bypass ====
The town's location at the intersection of the routes from London to Bristol and from Southampton to Birmingham made it, for many years, a transport bottleneck. In 1963 a dual carriageway was built east of the town centre to ease congestion and the opening of the M4 motorway in 1971 moved the intersection of these major trunk routes three miles (five kilometres) north of the town, to Chieveley. The ring road around the town still suffered serious congestion and the Newbury bypass was proposed in 1981. The plans were approved in 1990. The road was built and finally opened in 1998. In August 2004, the improved A34-M4 junction was re-opened which allowed north–south traffic on the A34 to completely bypass the earlier roundabout at the M4. This junction continued to be improved, with new road markings and traffic signals completed in 2008.

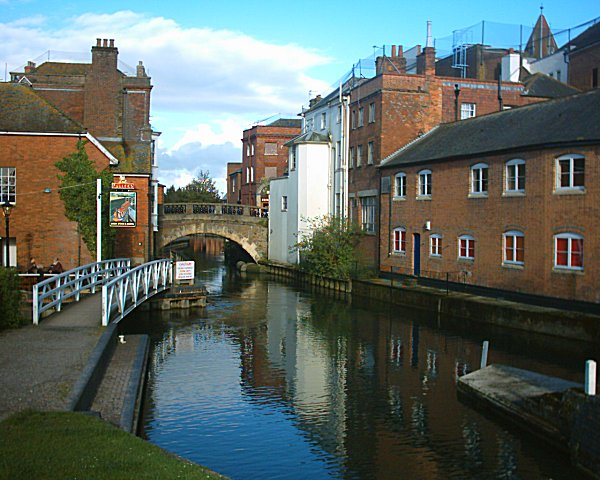
The Kennet and Avon Canal runs through the middle of Newbury

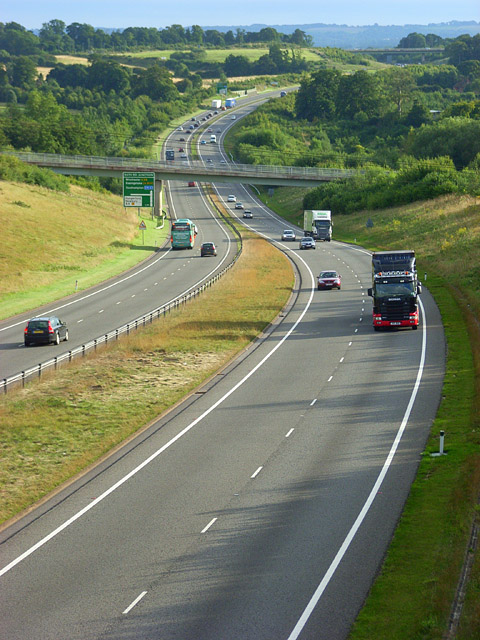
The Newbury Bypass near Donnington

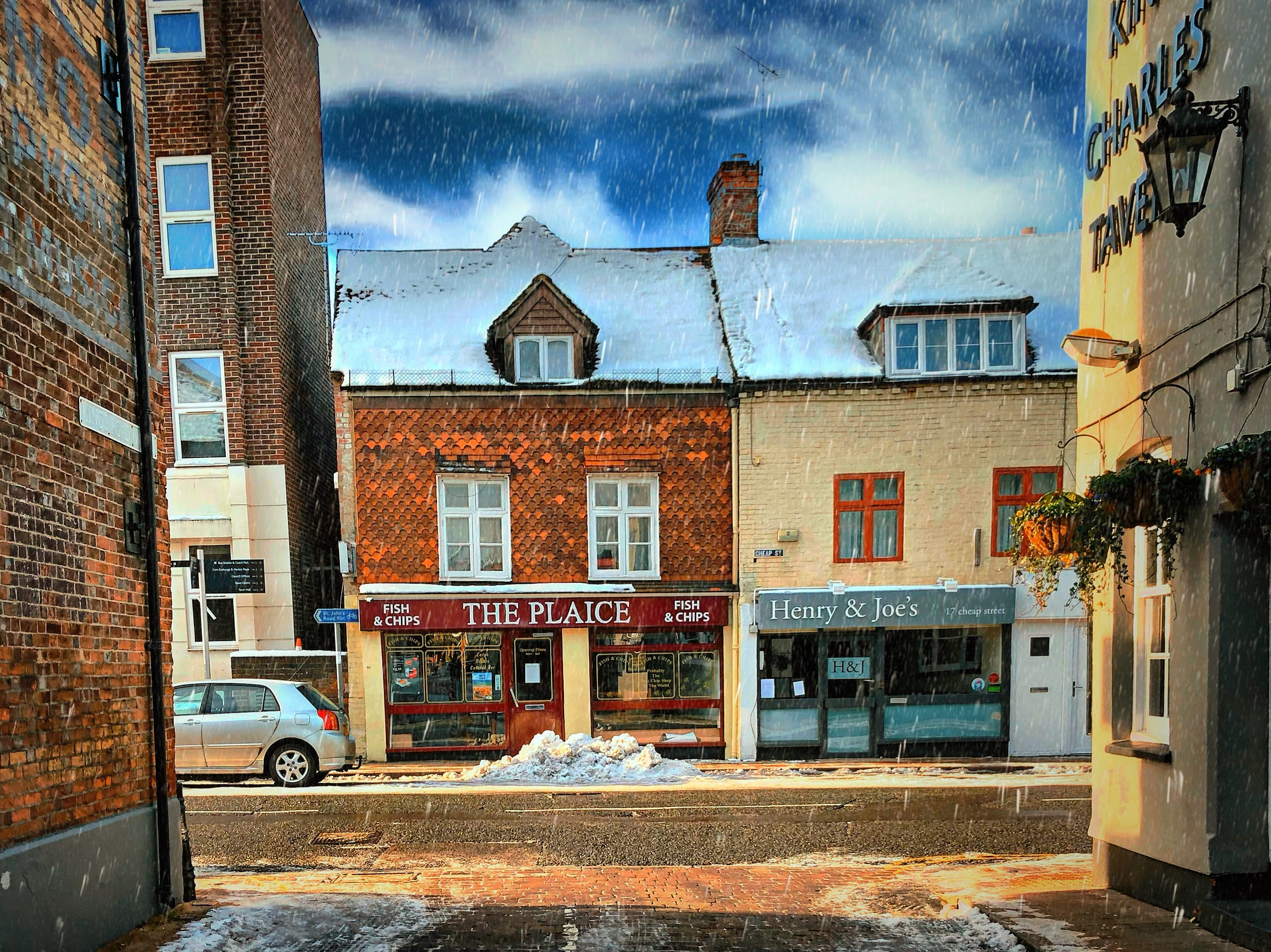
Cheap Street

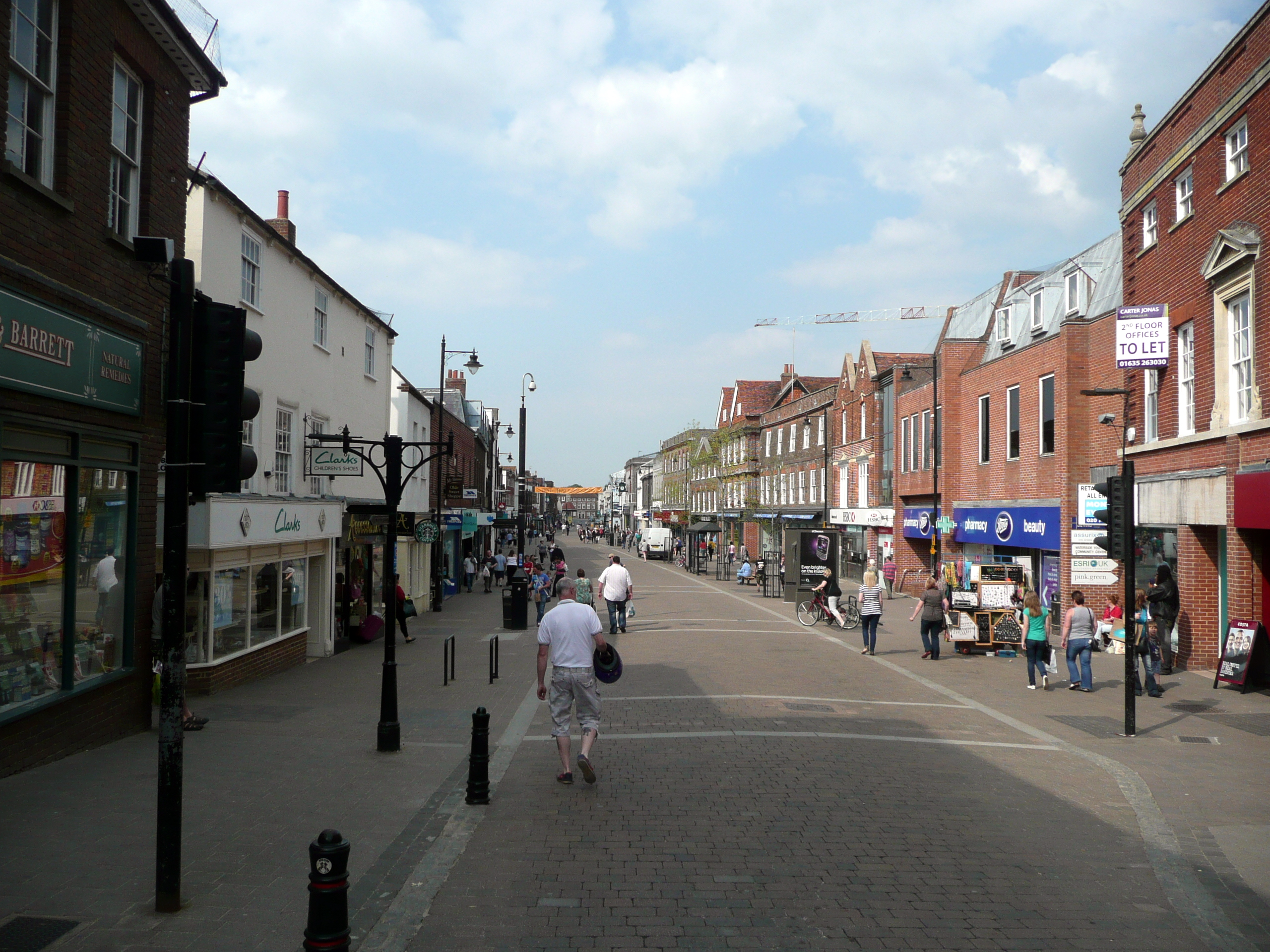
Northbrook Street, Newbury

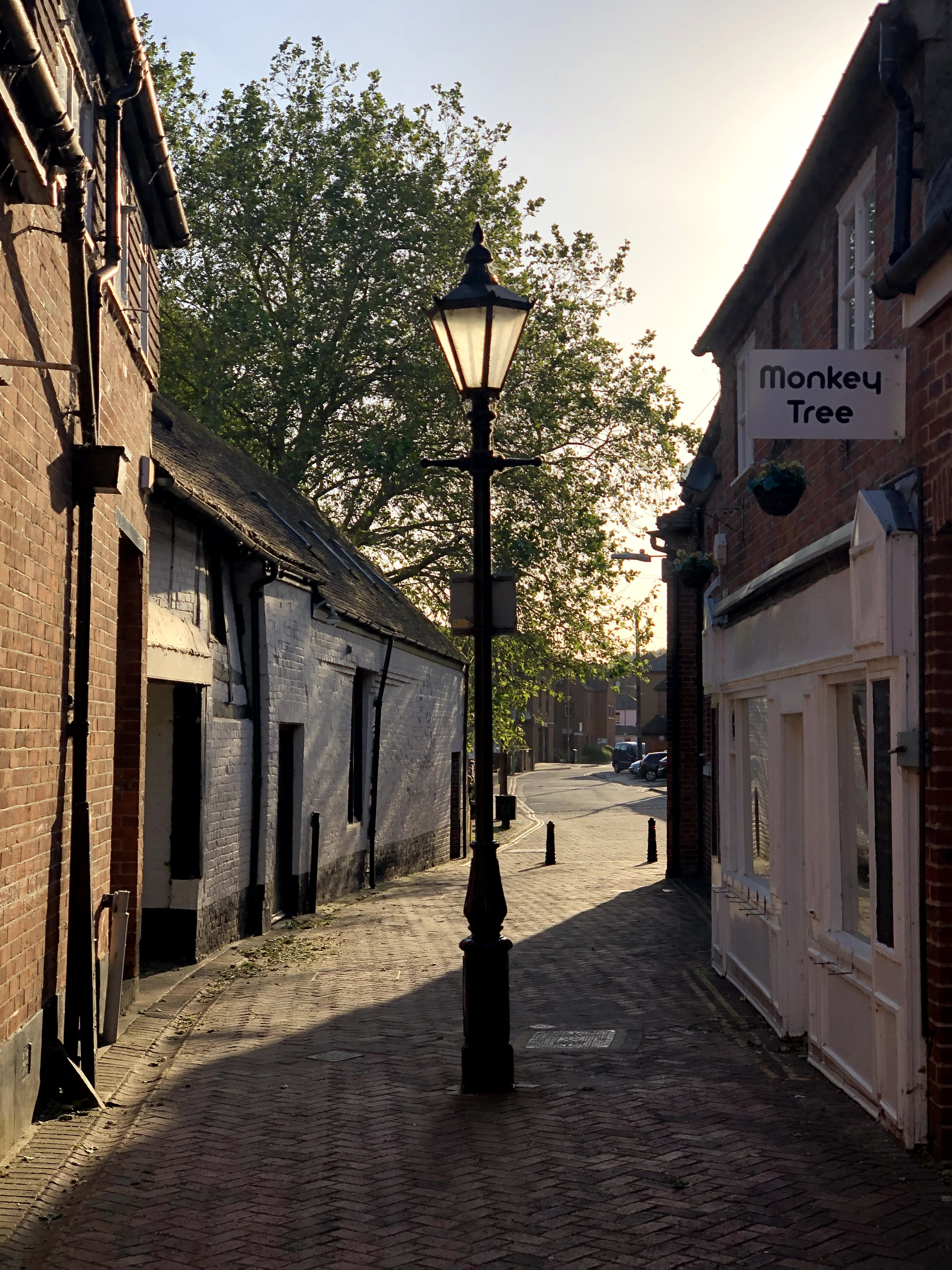
Intersection between Northcroft Street, Northbrook Street and Bridge Street

== Education ==
Newbury has three main secondary schools:

- St. Bartholomew's School – one of the oldest schools in Berkshire, founded in 1466.
- Park House School
- Trinity School, formed after the closure of Shaw House School and Turnpike School.

There is also Newbury College, a further and higher education college, funded by a private finance initiative, and Mary Hare School, a residential co-educational community special needs school for deaf pupils.

Independent schools nearby include:

- Horris Hill, an all-boys day and boarding school (from ages 4 to 13; boarding from 7 to 13)
- Downe House School
- Cheam School
- St Gabriel's School, a co-ed school (from the ages 3 to 18)
- Thorngrove School, a day co-educational school in nearby Highclere (from the ages 2½ to 13)
- Newbury Hall School, an international high school
- St Michael's School, a Roman Catholic school in Burghclere

== Sports and leisure ==
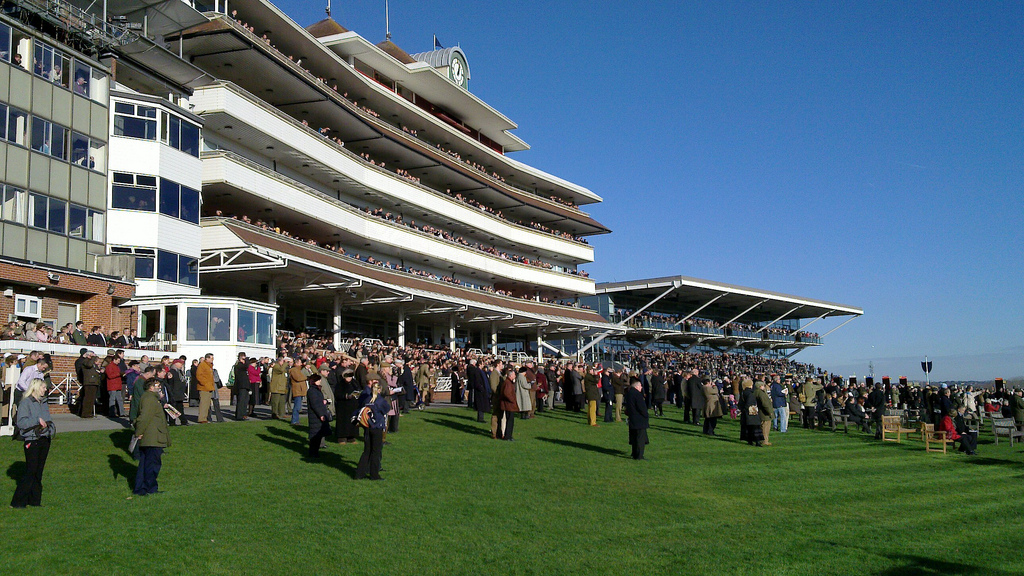
The Berkshire Stand and The Grandstand at Newbury Racecourse

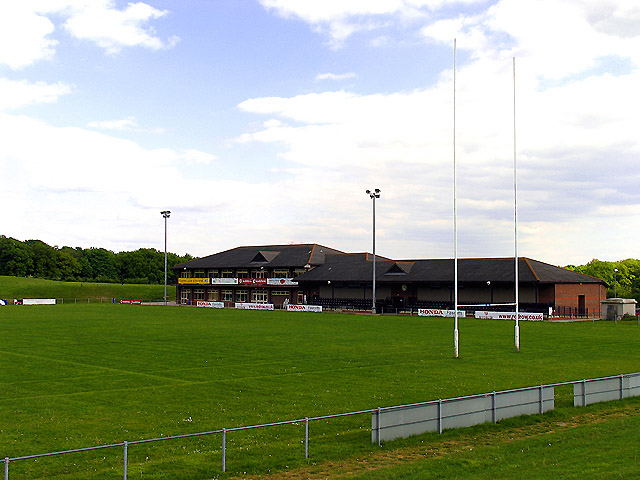
Newbury R.F.C. home ground

Newbury is home to one of England's major racecourses, Newbury Racecourse, which held its first race meeting in 1905. The most prestigious race in the calendar is the Coral Gold Cup, which normally takes place in late November. The Racecourse also frequently plays host to a series of concerts on race days during the summer, which has included Olly Murs, Craig David, Tom Jones, Rick Astley and Madness in recent years.

Northcroft Lido in Newbury's Northcroft Park is one of the last remaining lidos in the United Kingdom. It was originally built in the 1890s, although the current structure was erected in the 1930s. The pool is still in use today and received a major renovation in summer 2023. It is owned and subsidised by West Berkshire Council but is managed by an external contractor, Parkwood Leisure.

Newbury was home to A.F.C. Newbury, with their home ground situated at Faraday Road near the town centre, but the club collapsed after Vodafone pulled its sponsorship of the team in May 2006. A local pub team from the Old London Apprentice took over the Faraday Road ground temporarily and rebranded itself as Newbury F.C. in 2007, which has played in the Hellenic Football League since 2008. The team were forced to leave their home ground at Faraday Road in 2018, with the site remaining derelict since and the team playing in a number of temporary venues, including in nearby Lambourn. However, work began in May 2023 to restore the football ground at Faraday Road following the election of a new Liberal Democrat-run local council. Newbury F.C. returned to Faraday Road for the 2024/25 season, playing in the Thames Valley Premier League Premier Division.

Newbury's rugby union club Newbury R.F.C., founded in 1928, has been based at a purpose-built ground at Monks Lane since 1996. The town has two cricket teams, including Newbury Cricket Club, founded in 1822 and playing at Northcroft Playing Fields, and Falkland Cricket Club, which in May 2023 hosted the first ever professional cricket match in West Berkshire with a match between the Southern Vipers and South East Stars in the Charlotte Edwards Cup.

Newbury has two athletics clubs, Team Kennet and Newbury Athletic Club, which train at the Crookham Common Athletics Track. The town is also home to numerous golf courses. The most notable is situated at the historic Donnington Grove estate, built in 1763 and where a golf course was opened in 1993.

Victoria Park is the town's main park, located near the centre of the town, and includes tennis courts, a boating pond, adventure golf course, skatepark and bowling green. The park is frequently used for local events throughout the year, such as the Newbury Waterways Festival in July. Between 2004 and 2011, the Park's bandstand played host to the Keep Off The Grass (KOTG) dance music event. Until 2018, it was also the finish line of the Crafty Craft, an improvised raft race along the canal.

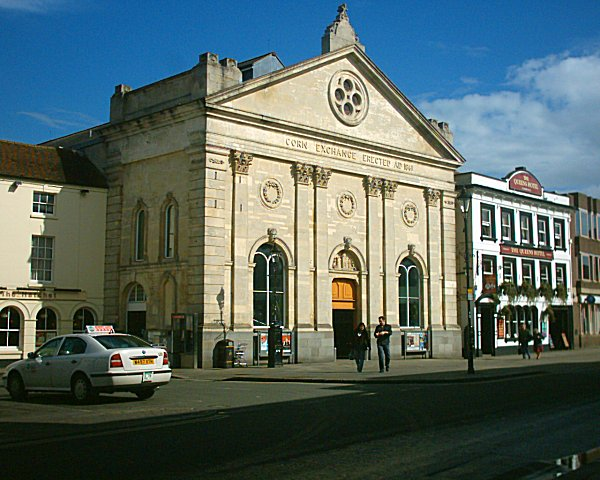
The Corn Exchange

Newbury's arts scene is primarily centred around the Corn Exchange, a 400-seat auditorium situated in the Market Place which provides a venue for both professional and amateur live performances as well as hosting an independent cinema. English rock band the Who performed at the Corn Exchange in 1966. The Watermill Theatre, a 220-seat theatre, is located just outside Newbury in Bagnor, and the former Greenham Common air force base is home to The Base, a dedicated arts centre which opened in 2019 in partnership with the Corn Exchange and Greenham Trust.

Since 1979, the Newbury Spring Festival of classical music has brought internationally renowned soloists and ensembles to a variety of venues in and around the town. The Newbury Comedy Festival emerged as a major event in 2004 and played host to comedians such as Alan Carr and Jo Brand, but ended in 2012.

Newbury Showground, located to the north of the town centre in Hermitage, is also a major local events venue. It hosts the annual Newbury Show every September, an agricultural and farming show which attracts over 50,000 visitors and which returned in 2023 after a 3-year hiatus.

== Media ==
Local news and television programmes are provided by BBC South and ITV Meridian from the Hannington TV transmitter.

There are four main local radio stations broadcasting in the Newbury area; BBC Radio Berkshire; a community radio station, Kennet Radio; and two Independent Local Radio stations – Greatest Hits Radio Berkshire & North Hampshire (formerly 'Newbury Sound', 'Kick FM', 'Kestrel FM' and 'The Breeze') which broadcasts from London and Manchester, and Heart South (formerly 2-Ten FM) which broadcasts into the area from London. The following local newspapers are distributed in Newbury (circulation):

- Newbury Weekly News (Part of Newbury Weekly News, advertising-funded free paper) (33,400)
- Newbury & Thatcham Chronicle (21,500)
- Newbury Weekly News (24,300)

== Places of interest ==
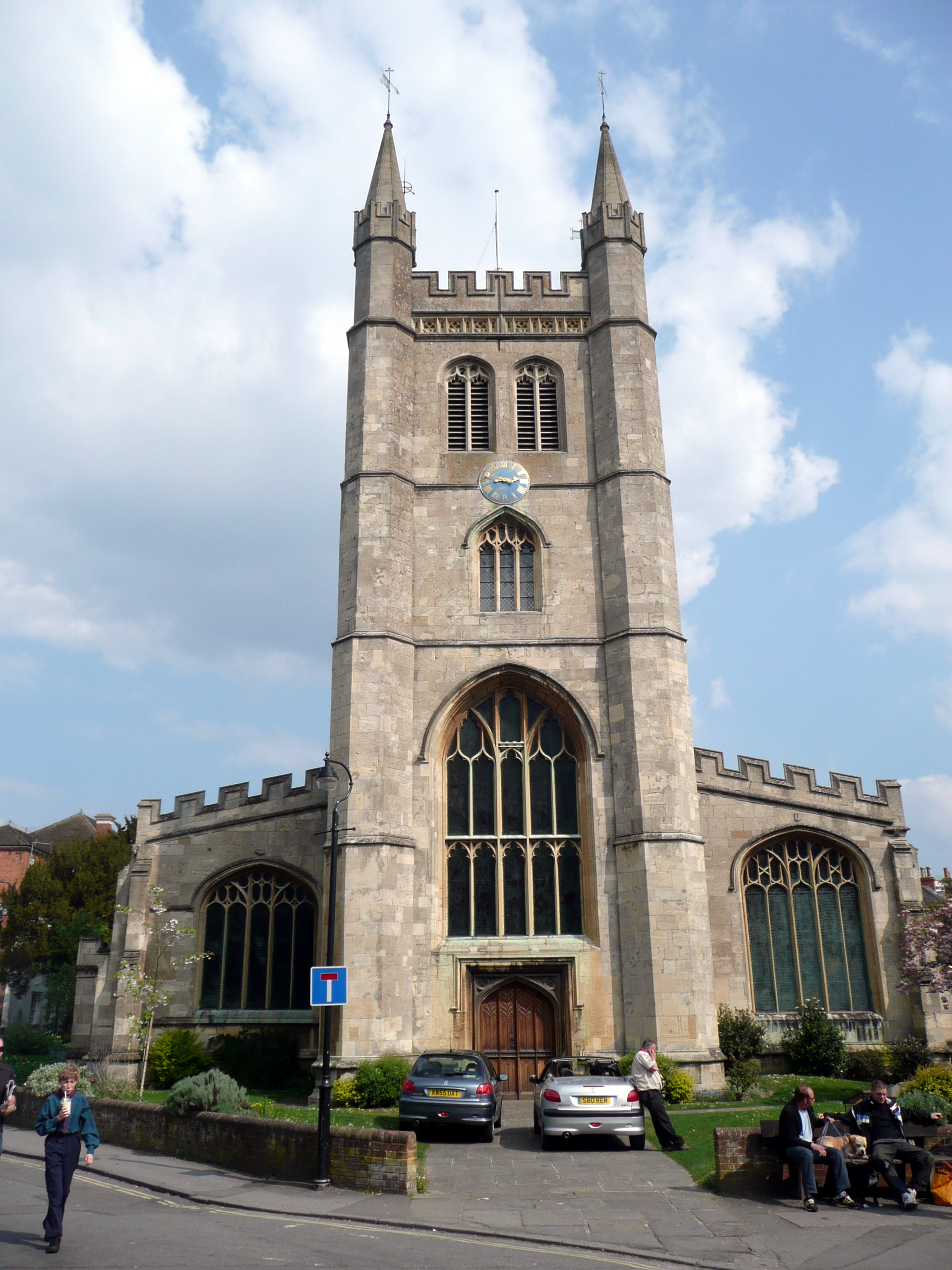
St Nicolas' Church

- The Corn Exchange – theatre and cinema.
- Kennet and Avon Canal shop and tearooms.
- West Berkshire Museum.
- Jack of Newbury's House.
- St Nicolas' Church (CofE), completed in 1532. This is a fine example of a parish church built entirely in the Perpendicular style.
- St Joseph's Church, Newbury, Roman Catholic church with Italianate architecture.
- St Bartholomew's Hospital (almshouses).
- Raymond Almshouses, Newtown Road, built in 1796, founded by Philip Jemmett of Kintbury, and endowed by his daughter Anne and her husband Sir Jonathan Raymond, Alderman of the City of London.
- The Litten Chapel.
- The Falkland Memorial.
- Donnington Castle.
- Nearby places of interest include Bucklebury Farm Park, Combe Gibbet, Highclere Castle, the Sandham Memorial Chapel, The Nature Discovery Centre, the Watermill Theatre and Watership Down.
- New Greenham Arts – an ex-US military building on Greenham Common airbase, now used to house artist studios, and a performing arts centre.
- Disused GAMA cruise missile storage area at Greenham Common.
- Greenham Control Tower cafe and museum.

== Notable people ==
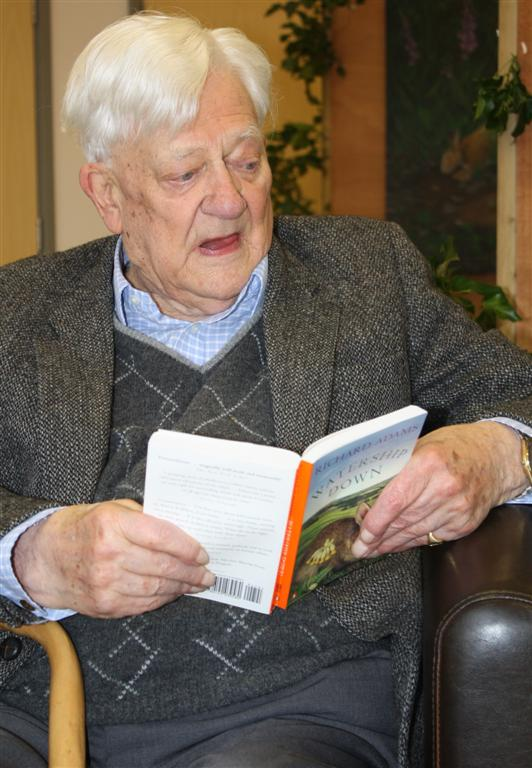
Richard Adams

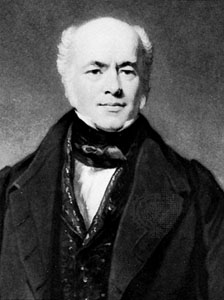
Francis Baily

A number of notable people have originated from, worked, lived or died in Newbury:

- Richard Adams (1920–2016), author
- Hannah Aldworth (?–1778), philanthropist
- Roger Attfield (1939–), thoroughbred horse trainer
- Francis Baily (1774–1844), astronomer
- Captain Collet Barker (1784–1831), early Australian explorer
- Michael Bond (1926–2017), creator of Paddington Bear
- Harry Bowl (1914–1991), footballer
- Bruno Brookes (1959–), radio and television presenter
- Lord Carey (1935–), former Archbishop of Canterbury
- Lawrence Chaney (1996–), drag performer
- Simon Channing-Williams (1945–2009), film producer
- Keith Chegwin (1957–2017), television presenter
- Harry Cotterell (1841–1925), British trader
- Miles or Myles Coverdale (1488–1569), bishop, co-author of the 1st English Bible
- George Dangerfield (1904–1986), journalist and author
- Mary Farmer (born 1940 Newbury, Berkshire - Died 2021 Boston, Lincolnshire) UK-based designer and weaver of tapestries and rugs
- Sebastian Faulks (1953–), author
- Gerald Finzi (1901–1956), composer and founder of the Newbury String Players
- Jill Fraser (1946–2006), Watermill Theatre owner and director
- William Henry Gore (1857–1942), painter of the Berkshire countryside, born and died in Newbury.
- James Hanson, Lord Hanson (1922–2004), haulier, later venture capitalist
- Alec Hopkins (1986–), actor who played the young Severus Snape in Harry Potter and the Order of the Phoenix
- Sir Michael Hordern (1911–1995), actor
- Luke Humphries (1995–), professional darts player
- John Kendrick (1573–1624), philanthropic patron of the town of Reading
- Edwin Lewis (1881–1959), Methodist theologian
- William Marshal "The Marshal" seen as first Lord Marshal, (1147–1219) medieval knight given up as a hostage at 'Newbury Castle'
- Henry Martin (?-1866), British murderer
- Jack O'Newbury (1489–1557), cloth merchant and patron
- John Septimus Roe (1797–1878), the first Surveyor-General of Western Australia
- "Lord" George Sanger (1825–1911), circus owner born in Newbury who gave the Queen Victoria statue to the town in 1902
- Hannah Snell (1723–1792), female soldier
- Edward C. ('Ted') Titchmarsh (1899–1963), leading 20th-century theoretical mathematician
- Theo Walcott (1989–), retired footballer, originally for A.F.C. Newbury. He played for Southampton before his retirement and previously played for Arsenal and Everton
- Sir Frank Williams (1942–2021) – Formula One manager, founded the WilliamsF1 team
- Tim Jeffrey (1996-) – Paralympic shooter for Team GB

Nobles killed at the First Battle of Newbury

- Earl of Carnarvon
- Earl of Sunderland
- Lord Falkland

== See also ==
- Newbury power station

== General and cited references ==
- Higgott, Tony (2001). The Story of Newbury. Newbury, UK: Countryside Books. ISBN 9781846742736. OCLC 809543256.
- Money, Walter (1887). The History of the Ancient Town and Borough of Newbury, in the County of Berks. Oxford: Parker and Co. OCLC 10968350.
