= Newbury Castle =

Castle in Berkshire, England

- West Berkshire, Berkshire, England

Site information
- Type: Castle
- Condition: Earthworks

Location
- Shown within Berkshire
- Coordinates: 51.399°N 1.395°W

Newbury Castle is the name of an English adulterine castle built by John Marshal during The Anarchy. It is located west of the town of Newbury in the English county of Berkshire. The Castle is mentioned in L'Histoire de Guillaume le Marechal ('History of William the Marshal') wherein it describes King Stephen as besieging the castle in 1152 and holding Marshal's son, William Marshal, as a hostage against Newbury's surrender. When the elder Marshal refused to comply, Stephen threatened to have the young boy catapulted over the walls. John, ("that child of hell and root of all evil" according to Henry of Huntingdon) responded defiantly, "I have the anvils and the hammer to forge still better sons." King Stephen wasn't so heartless though—he relented and the boy survived.

Despite appearing proudly on the town's coat of arms, Newbury Castle does not appear to have been built in Newbury at all, but four miles away in the village of Hamstead Marshall. There, the mottes of three castles can be found, which would be consistent with the general tactics of siege warfare during this medieval period.

== See also ==
- Castles in Great Britain and Ireland
- List of castles in England
