= Wash Common =

Coordinates: 51.376°N 1.345°W

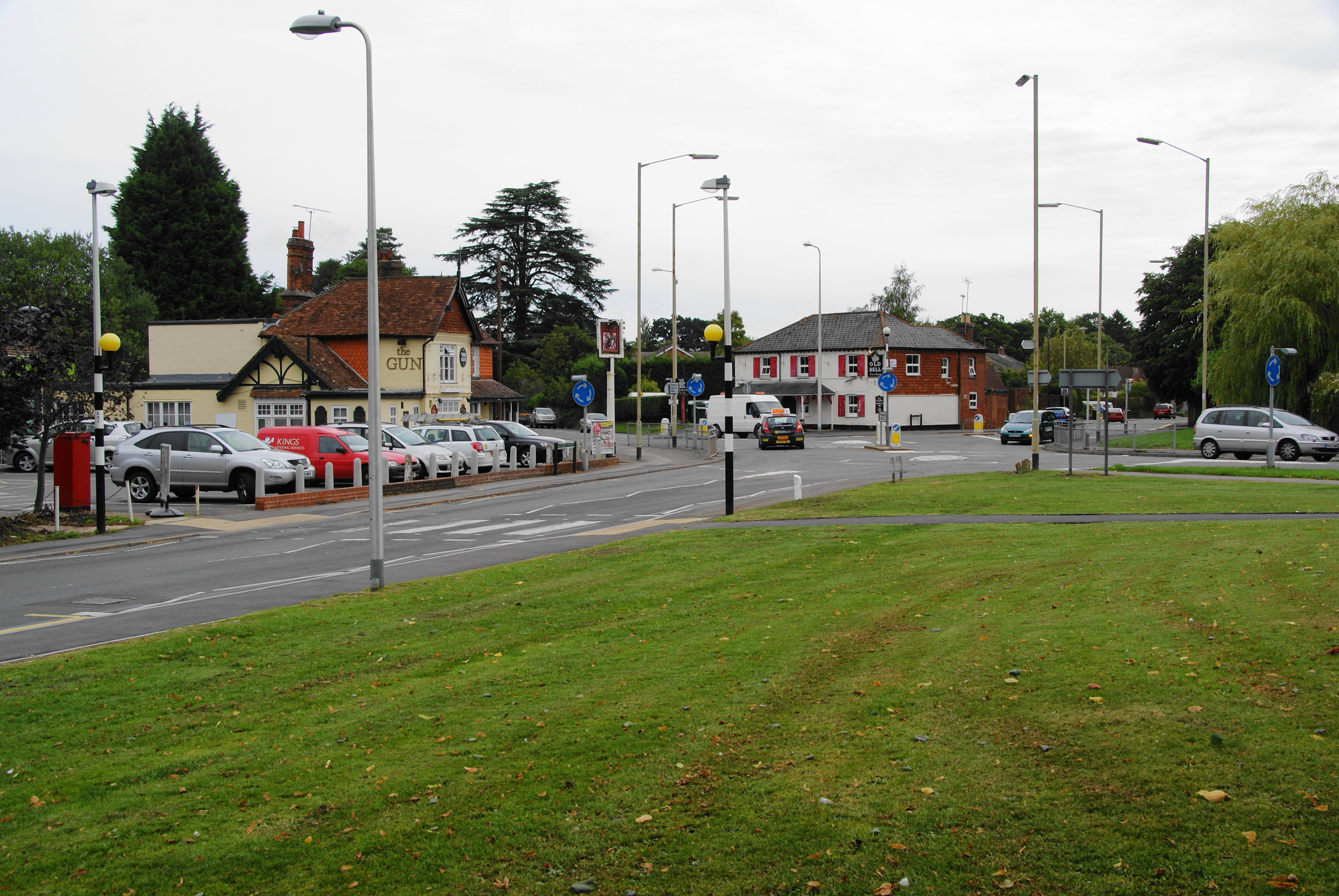
Wash Common

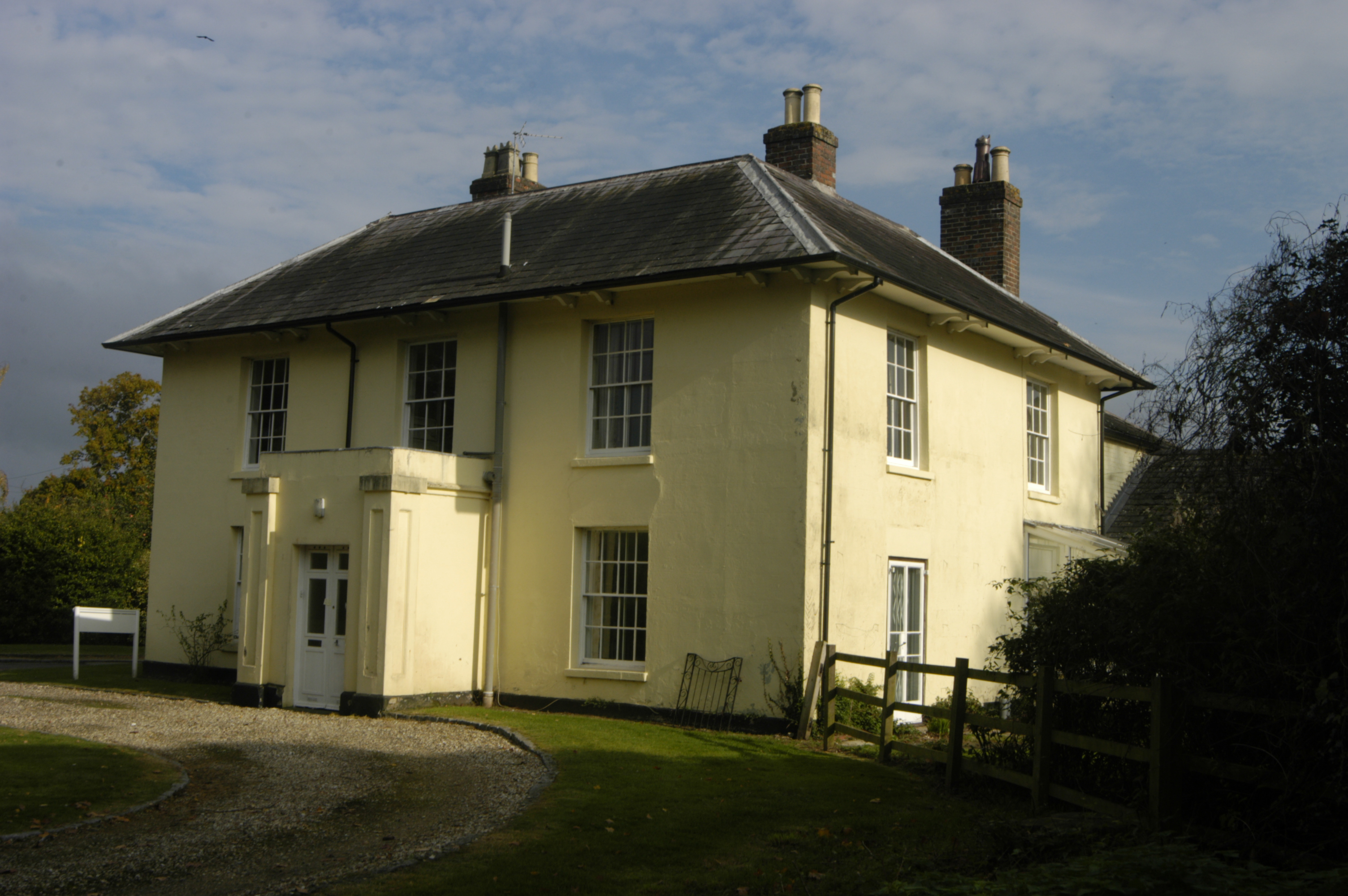
Warren Lodge, part of the St Francis de Sales' Roman Catholic church complex.

Wash Common is a suburban village to the south of Newbury. It is built on the former Newbury Wash, which was flat open heathland overlooking Newbury, and until the 19th century there was just a small group of houses separated from Newbury by open country. Both places have grown into each other, and the suburb of Wash Common is now contiguous with Newbury. Most housing development has taken place to the west of the Andover road, and some of the area to the east of the road still remains open farmland.

== Geography ==
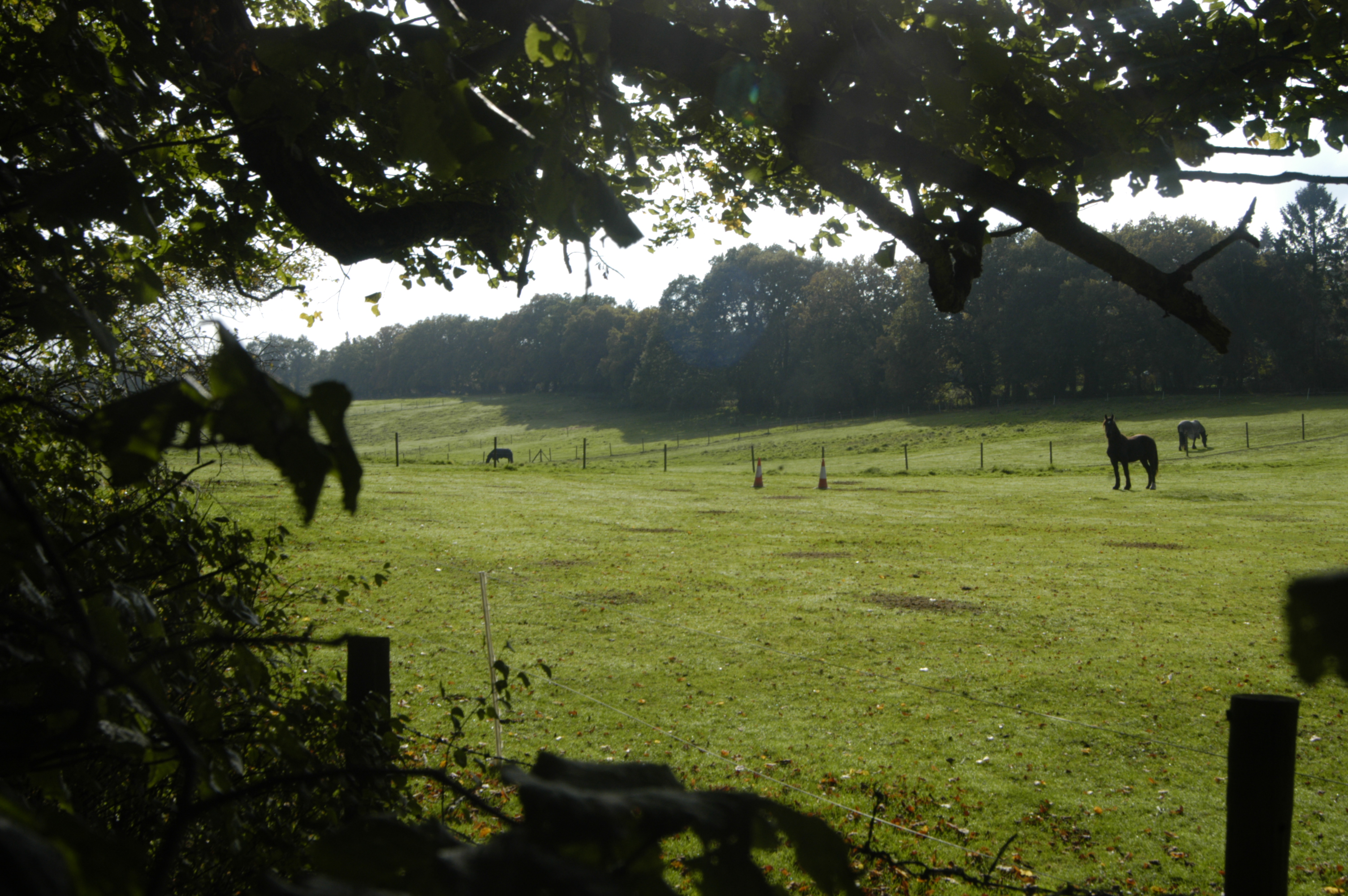
Meadow near Warren lodge, Wash Common.

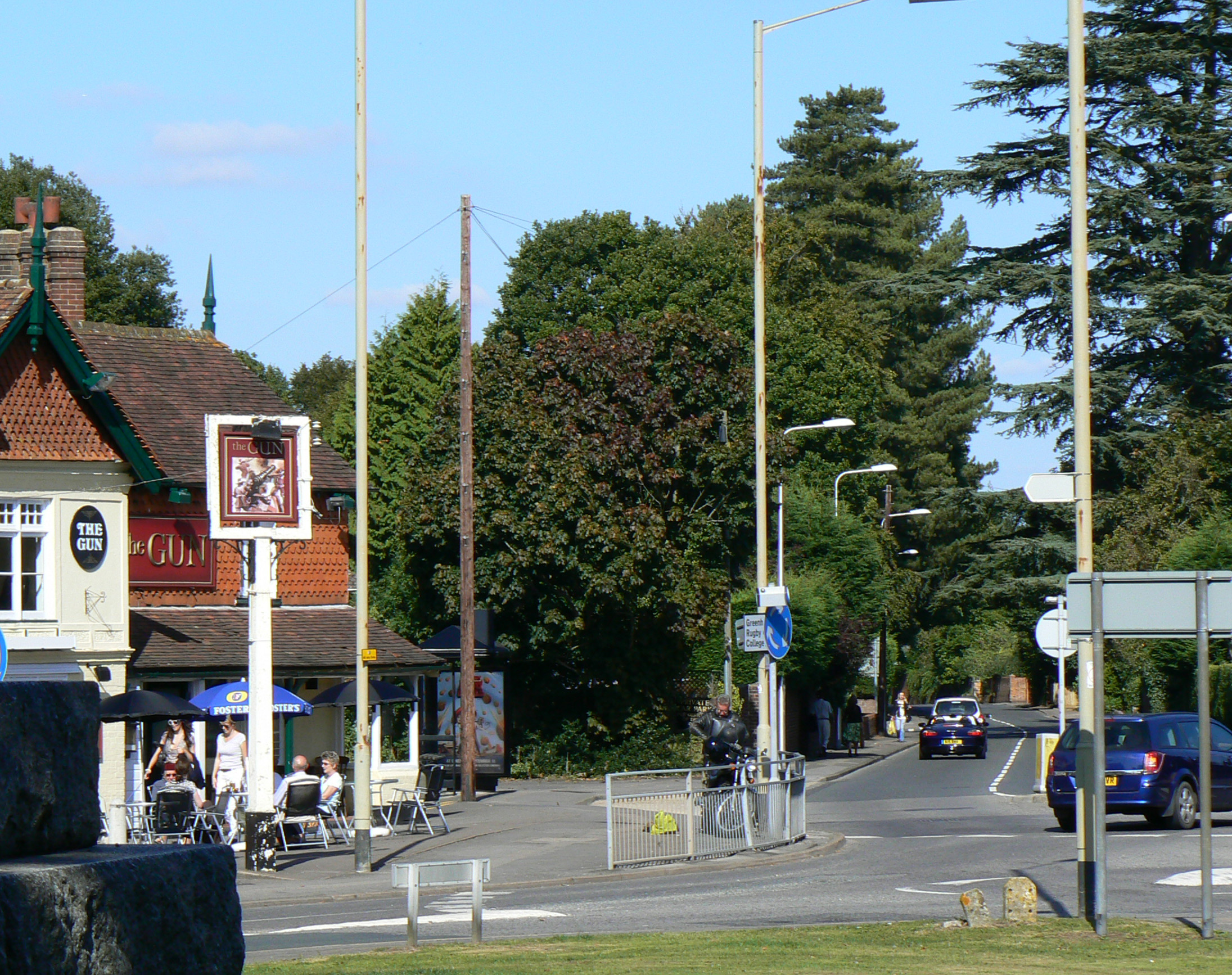
The Gun Pub, Wash Common, looking north along the Andover Road

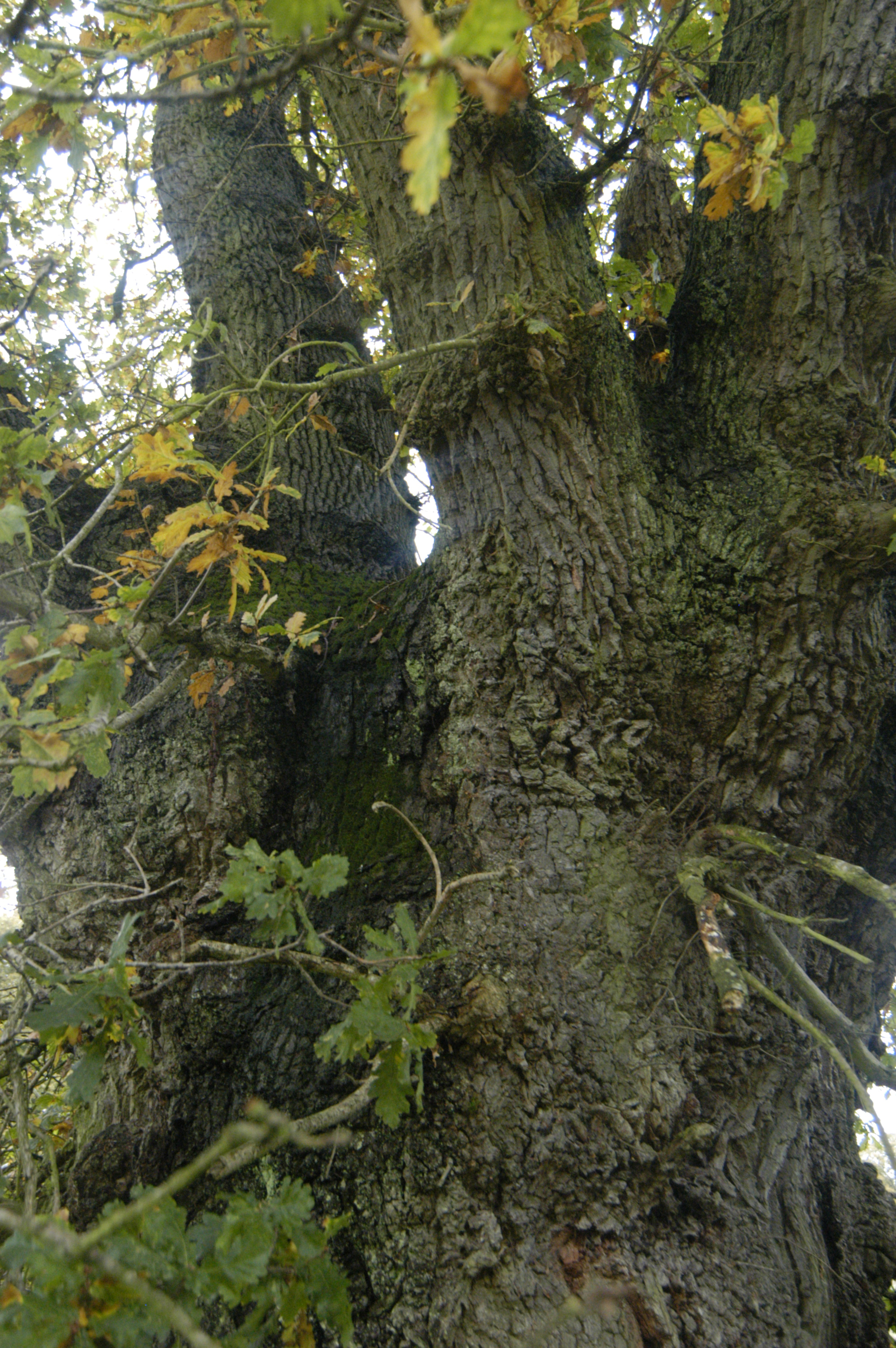
A pollard oak marking part of the ancient parish boundary of Wash Common, part of Newbury, and Sandleford.

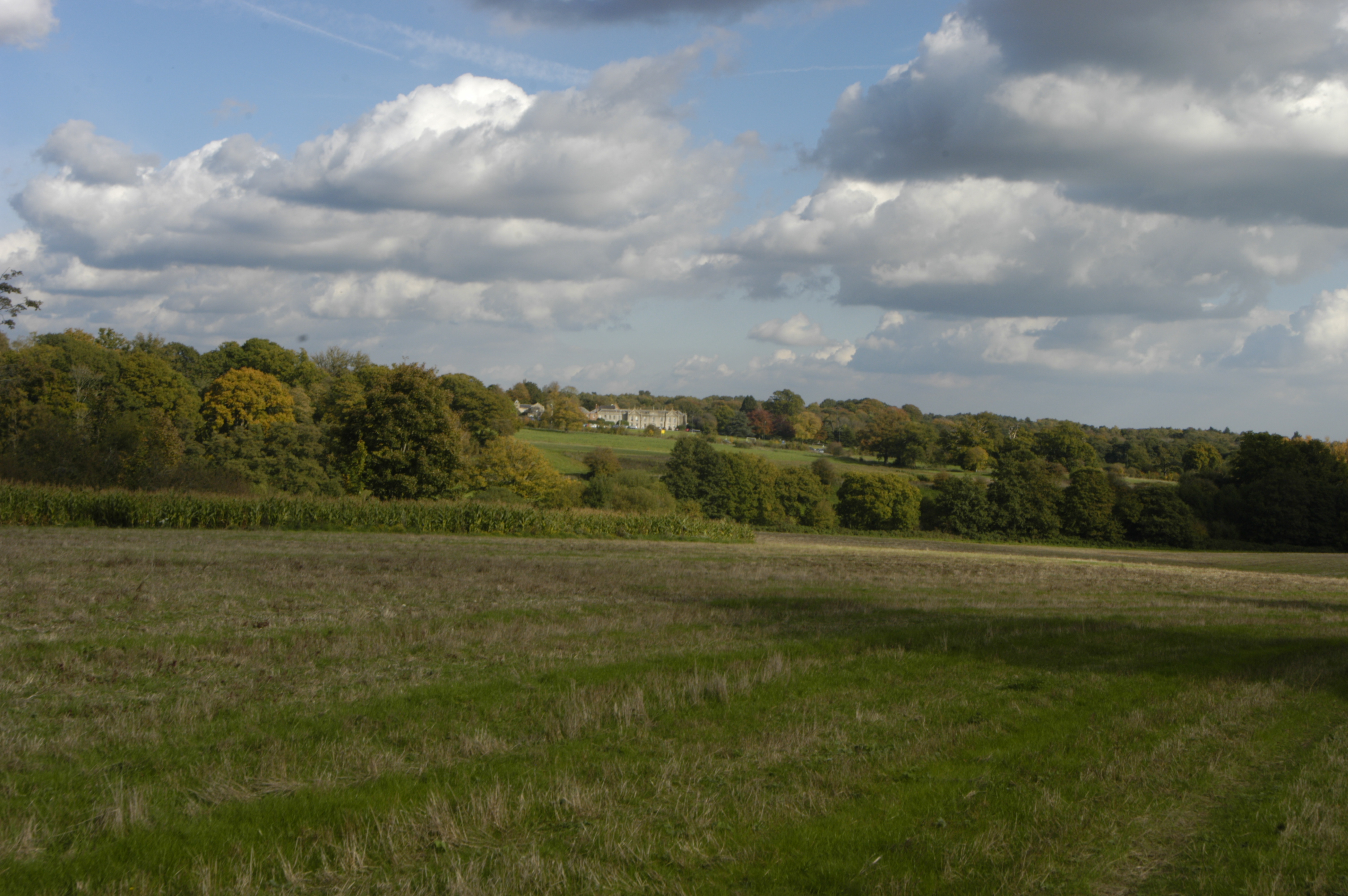
Sandleford Priory from the west, from the drive that connected the priory to the Andover road (A343), as seen between Dirty Ground Copse and Gorse Covert. This view is a short walk due east of Wash Common.

Wash Common is situated at the far western end of a plateau of sand and gravel which forms part of the Bagshot Formation. The plateau runs on an east–west axis, and its top originally consisted of boggy heath known as the Newbury Wash. The slope is steepest on the Western side, and to the north it overlooks the Kennet Valley, factors in the First Battle of Newbury. Towards the north west the main road climbs up a gentle incline from Newbury, and continues in a South Easterly direction down a rather steeper slope (once called Trundle Hill, a name no longer used) towards Andover. The level plateau on which it is situated continues for several miles to the east of Wash Common, and a mile to the east can be found the site of the former RAF Greenham Common.

== History ==
Wash Common is the location of five Bronze Age tumuli. The manorial rights over the common-field lands known as "The Wash" were acquired by the Mayor and Corporation of Newbury in 1627. A turnpike road from Oxford to Andover was built across Wash Common and included a gate near the Gun public house, which was in use up to 1880. A milestone still exists where the road slopes down to Hampshire. Until the latter part of the 19th century, Wash Common was open heathland.

In 1858 an enclosure resolution was passed; W Money, author of "A Popular History of Newbury" published in 1905, describes this act in terms of a land grab, (see chapter XVI): "it is scarcely necessary to add that the householders of Newbury received no compensation when thus deprived of the valuable rights and privileges which had been enjoyed by the commonality of the town for so many centuries, but their inheritance was bestowed on their more favoured neighbours, whose only claim was that they were already possessed, by purchase or otherwise, of land within the boundaries of the borough". The enclosure resolution opened the way for the progressive residential development of Wash Common, which continues to this day.

== First Battle of Newbury ==
Wash Common covers part of the site of the First Battle of Newbury. The slope which the Parliamentarians captured, east of Skinners Green and including Round Hill, lies just outside the boundary of Wash Common itself. It is still farmland and can be visited by foot. The Royalist artillery was sited near the present day Gun pub, which is now built over. The area where Prince Rupert's cavalry clashed with the Parliamentarians includes the present Wash Common recreation ground but is largely built over [ibid].

== Population and administration ==
Wash Common lies within West Berkshire. It forms part of the Wash common ward which incorporates the old Falkland Ward, which is represented in Newbury Town Council and West Berkshire Council. It is part of the Newbury parliamentary constituency. Current ward councilors include Adrian Abbs & Tony Vickers, from May 2019 until May 2023. The population of Falkland Ward was recorded in the 2001 Census as just over 6,000, of whom about half live in Wash Common.

== Today ==
Wash Common is the home of the 19th-century Falkland Memorial and Falkland Primary School (named after Lucius Cary, 2nd Viscount Falkland, who fell at the First Battle of Newbury), Park House Secondary School and Sports College, St George's Church (Anglican), St Francis de Sales' Church (Roman Catholic), Glendale Church (Independent), two pubs (The Gun and The Bowlers Arms), Falkland Cricket Club and Newbury Rugby Club. It is also famous as the birthplace of Richard Adams, the author of Watership Down, which begins in eastern Wash Common, specifically on the edge with the more rural and open region of Sandleford.
