= Courthope =

Courthope is an English surname originating in the country's South-East and historically most prevalent in Kent and Sussex. Notable people with the surname include:

- the Courthope baronets
- George Courthope (1616–1685), English politician
- Sir George Courthope, MP for Rye between 1906 and 1945
- George Frederick Courthope, London-based silversmith and jeweller in the 19th century
- Nathaniel Courthope (1585–c. 1620), English merchant
- Peter Courthope, brother to Nathaniel Courthope and owner of Danny House in the 17th century
- William Courthope, MP for Hastings in 1420 and 1421
- William Courthope (officer of arms) (1808–1866), English genealogist and herald
- William John Courthope, writer and historian
