= Jack O'Newbury =

Member of the Parliament of England

"Jack of Newbury" or John Winchcombe, also known as John Smallwood (c. 1489 −1557) was a leading English clothier from Newbury in Berkshire. When Tudor cloth-making was booming, and woollen cloth dominated English exports, John Winchcombe was producing for export on an industrial scale.

He was a leading clothier in other ways. Cloth-making was heavily regulated, and in the 1530s and 1540s Winchcombe led dozens of clothiers in a national campaign to persuade King Henry VIII to change the law on the making of woollen cloth – a campaign which proved ultimately successful.

He was the son of a clothier, but became a clothier in his own right before his father's death in 1520, and combined the two businesses, taking on property which had been leased to his father. He was already wealthy in the 1520s, and his growing prosperity led to a significant rise in his status.

== Wealth and Property ==
Winchcombe became a wealthy landowner, spending over £4,000 on the purchase of property in the 1540s, including the manors of Thatcham and Bucklebury in 1540, Farnborough (on the Berkshire Downs) in 1542, and Lockinge and Ginge in 1546.

In addition, he held a large portfolio of other property (much of it leased), mainly in and around Newbury. Some of this had previously been held by Sandleford Priory, dissolved in the 15th century.

== Berkshire gentry ==
He was one of the Berkshire gentry while continuing as a clothier, becoming a Justice of the Peace and a Member of Parliament, representing Great Bedwyn in 1545 and Cricklade in 1547. He may possibly also have served in earlier Parliaments; records for these are incomplete.

As one of the county gentry, John Winchcombe was asked to provide Newbury men to fight in Henry VIII's armies, beginning when he was listed as one of those to be approached "…for aid against the rebels in the north" (i.e. the Pilgrimage of Grace) in 1536. He was listed to supply men for the army in Flanders in 1543, with 10-foot soldiers specified; and for the Boulogne campaign in 1544. For the latter, contemporary documents show him at the head of 150 named Newbury men, all furnished with new coats. His will of 1557 includes references to 20 sets of armour and two demi-lances.

He was among those present for the reception of Henry VIII's fourth wife Anne of Cleves, and his personal contacts included Sir Thomas Gresham and the Protector Somerset. He was granted a coat of arms, and had his portrait painted in 1550.

== Cloth Production ==
The many different English cloths produced in the Tudor period were dominated by broadcloths and kersies, and current evidence shows Winchcombe producing kersey cloths on an industrial scale: over 6,000 cloths each year in the 1540s. Each kersey was about a yard (0.9m.) wide, and 17–18 yards long. The scale of his production is also indicated by his purchase of dyes: woad was his most important dye, frequently delivered by the cartload. One order survives for 541 cwt., or over 27 tons of woad.

Many workers were involved in the various stages of production, which included spinning and weaving. Fulling took place in local mills and the finished kersies were exported via London to Antwerp, where they were recognised in the 1530s and 1540s as the best of their kind. The Oxford Dictionary of National Biography says that Winchcombe's cloths "came to enjoy an unquestioned superiority, not only in Antwerp, where they were in great demand, but also in markets in Italy, the Levant, Germany, Hungary, and elsewhere, where they had the greatest renown…"

The value attached to his cloth is illustrated by evidence of an order from Thomas Cromwell for 1,000 cloths, and that English merchants overseas would sometimes only sell Winchcombe cloths to those who would purchase inferior cloths at the same time.

Although Winchcombe has in the past been credited with founding England's first factory, no documentary evidence of a weaving workshop has yet been traced. However, the quantity of cloths produced suggests a workshop of perhaps 30–50 looms.

== Jack of Newbury's House ==
His home was off the east side of Northbrook Street in Newbury, with a street frontage of 29 m. (96 feet). It filled the area between Jack Street and Marsh Lane (now mostly occupied by Marks & Spencer, and previously by the Jack Hotel), running back towards the Marsh (now Victoria Park).

It was here he welcomed the future Protector Somerset. The premises consisted of timber-framed buildings ranged around courtyards, including a panelled hall and parlour, buttery, kitchen, cheesehouse, bakehouse, bolting house and brewhouse, as well as numerous "chambers" or bedrooms. A small part of this extensive home survives on the corner of Marsh Lane, complete with external carvings and mouldings. Carved panels from the interior are now at Sudeley Castle in Gloucestershire.

That this was Winchcombe's home is shown in a contemporary survey, and the association was marked in 2016 by the addition of a local blue plaque. Some parts of the cloth-making process were also carried out here. His acquisition of Bucklebury led to the building of a grand Tudor house there, which became home to his eldest son.

== Death in 1557 ==
Winchcombe's last will was written on 28 June 1557. He died soon after, and he was buried in St. Nicolas [sic] Church in Newbury on 8 December. This was the church which was rebuilt in the 1520s and 1530s, and his merchant's mark (a capital 'I’ with a lower-case sigma across the centre) appears regularly among the roof bosses in the nave. In this church, he and his son took part in hearings which condemned three Protestants to be burnt to death during Queen Mary's reign. His will was proved on 23 May 1558. In spite of his importance, no memorial to him has survived in the church, although there is a brass to his father.

He had been married at least three times, and he was survived by his children John, Thomas, Henry and Anne. His eldest son, the third John Winchcombe, also served as a Member of Parliament in the 1550s and 1570s.

== The Pleasant History ==
The Pleasant Historie of Iohn Winchcombe, in his younger yeares called Iack of Newberie, the famous and worthy Clothier of England, a fictionalised story of Winchcombe’s life written by the silk-weaver and balladist Thomas Deloney, was first published in 1597. Parts of this work are loosely based on Winchcombe's life, but the narrative is expanded by imagination and plagiarism, and it is normally categorised as fiction rather than history. It was Deloney who introduced the "Jack of Newbury" name in print, and the book rapidly went through many editions. Winchcombe became a national celebrity along the lines of Dick Whittington or Robin Hood. The "Jack O'Newbury" form is a later corruption of the name.

Deloney described Winchcombe's premises as containing 200 looms, and also related a visit by Henry VIII and his Queen Katherine which is not supported by direct evidence, although Henry VIII passed through Newbury on several occasions. It was Deloney who transposed the Boulogne campaign for that of Flodden: both are occasions when England was simultaneously at war with Scotland and France. Deloney's liberties with history have led to Winchcombe being frequently confused with his father of the same name (also known as John Smallwood), who died in 1520 and was also a Newbury clothier. The identification of "Jack" with the father was popularised by influential Newbury historian Walter Money in 1887, and widely followed afterwards. The History of Parliament (1982) associates the name with the father, but the Oxford Dictionary of National Biography (2013) notes that it "has been plausibly argued" that Deloney's work referred to the son.

Thomas Fuller described Jack of Newbury in the 17th century as "…the most considerable Clothier (without fancy or fiction) England ever beheld."
