= River Enborne =

River in Hampshire and Berkshire, England

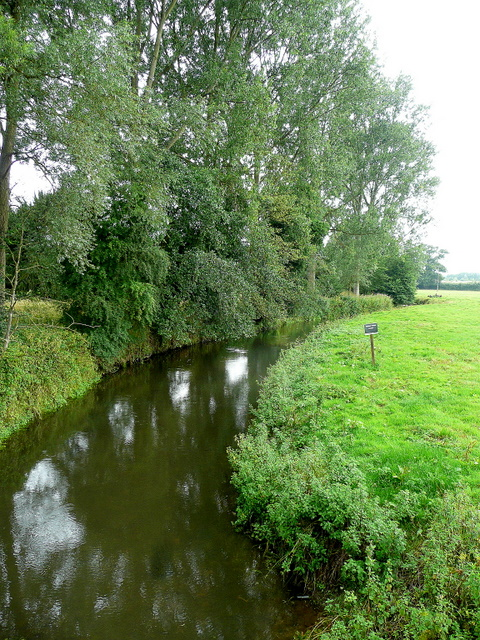
- The River Enborne from Shalford Bridge, near Brimpton

Location
- Country: England
- Counties: Hampshire, Berkshire
- Towns and Villages: Ball Hill, Enborne Row, Newtown, Brimpton, Aldermaston Wharf

Physical characteristics
- Source
  - location: Inkpen and West Woodhay, Berkshire, United Kingdom
  - coordinates: 51.3704°N 1.4588°W
  - elevation: 155 m (509 ft)
- Mouth: River Kennet
  - location: Aldermaston Wharf, Berkshire, United Kingdom
  - coordinates: 51.3914°N 1.1528°W
  - elevation: 55 m (180 ft)

The River Enborne is a river that rises near the villages of Inkpen and West Woodhay, to the West of Newbury, Berkshire and flows into the River Kennet. Its source is in the county of Berkshire, and part of its course forms the border between Berkshire and Hampshire. Despite the name, the river does not run through the village of Enborne, although it does run through Enborne Row.

== Geography ==
From its source near the villages of Inkpen and Woodhay, the Enborne flows Eastwards towards Newbury. At Smith's Bridge, near Holtwood the river is also now the boundary between Berkshire and Hampshire. Continuing East the river is crossed by the A34 (Newbury bypass) at Enborne Row to the South of Newbury. Near here to the South is "The Chase" and "Great Pen Wood," woodland managed by the National Trust. It flows due east touching part of Wash Common and then along the boundary of Sandleford and Highclere, reaching Newtown, Hampshire. At Sandleford and Newtown, near the Newbury to Whitchurch road, there was a mill, and here too, circa 1780, Capability Brown gave Mrs. Elizabeth Montagu, of Sandleford, plans to ornament the river. Forty years earlier in 1743 Mrs Montagu described the river, then also known as the Alder stream, to her friend the Duchess of Portland: 'A silver stream washes the foot of the village [Newtown]; health, pleasure, and refreshment are the ingredients that qualify this spring; no debauch, or intoxication, arises from its source'. It then passes to the South of Greenham Common, and here, near Headley, the river is joined by a tributary from the South, from Ecchinswell and Watership Down Hill.

The river continues meandering its way across open farmland towards Brimpton Common. At Inwood Copse a change in the landscape sends the river to the northeast, and it no longer forms the border between Hampshire and Berkshire. It joins the River Kennet between the villages of Aldermaston and Aldermaston Wharf.

== The river in fiction ==
The river plays a significant part in Richard Adams' novel, Watership Down. Early in the book, the rabbits from Sandleford are threatened by a dog. Blackberry realises that they can float across on a wooden board, and thus they make their escape.

== Picture gallery ==
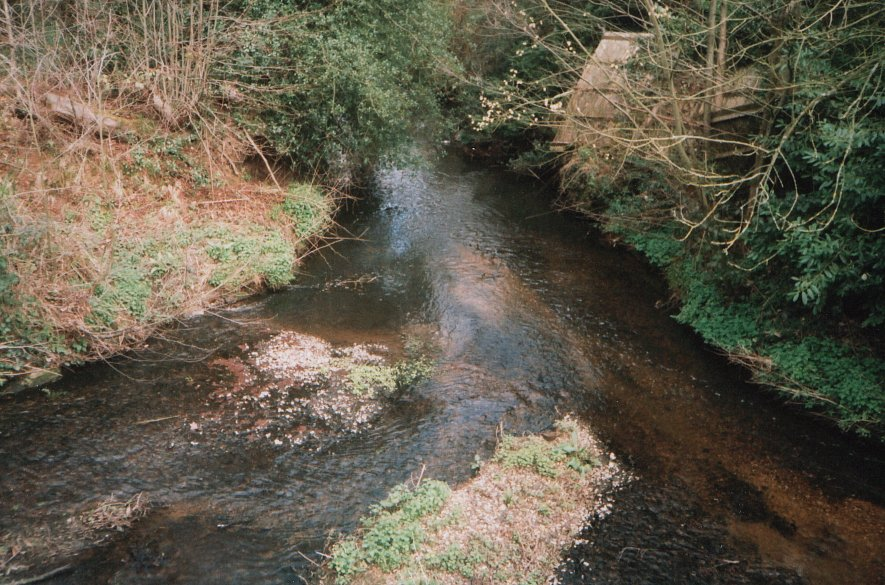
River Enborne

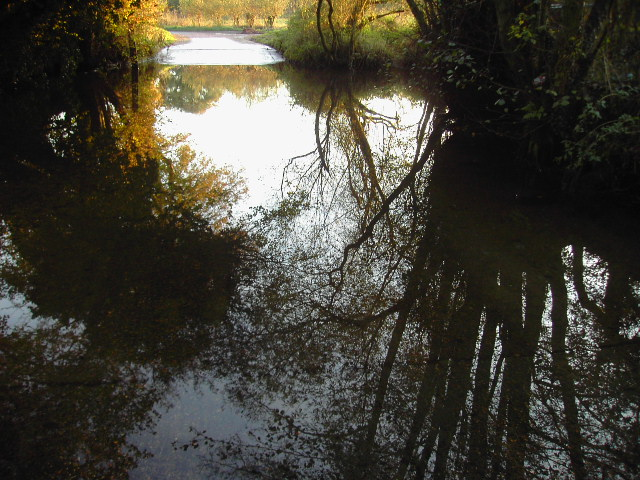
River Enborne at Headley Ford, near Crookham Common

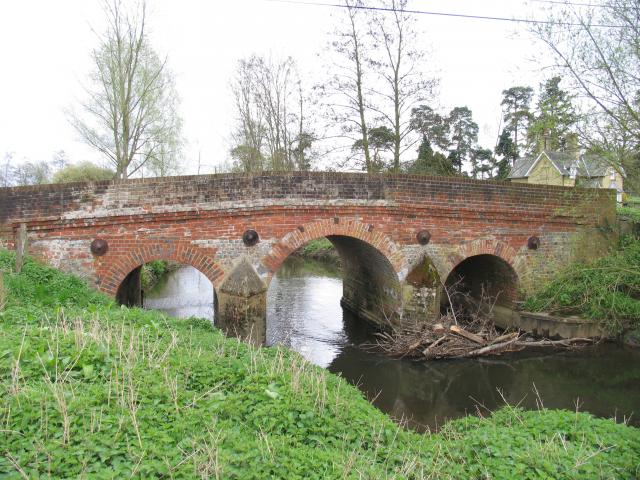
River Enborne at Shalford bridge, near Brimpton

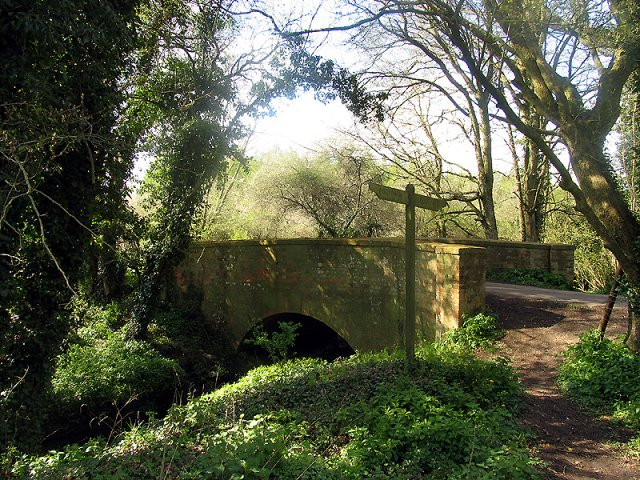
Oxford Bridge over a small tributary of the River Enborne, near Inwood Copse
