= Woodhay =

Woodhay is an area on the border between Berkshire and Hampshire, England. The following articles refer to this area:

- East Woodhay, a village and civil parish in Hampshire
- West Woodhay, a village and civil parish in Berkshire
- Woodhay railway station, a long-closed station just inside Hampshire
