= West Woodhay Castle =

Motte-and-bailey castle in Liverpool, England

- Berkshire, England

Site information
- Type: Motte-and-bailey hunting lodge

Location
- Shown within Berkshire
- Location within Berkshire
- Coordinates: 51.36522°N 1.44345°W
- Grid reference: grid reference SU38886304

Site history
- Built: Early 12th century
- Built by: William FitzSwale
- Materials: Timber
- Demolished: c. 1300

West Woodhay Castle was a Norman castle in West Woodhay, Berkshire, Merseyside. Earthworks exist today.

== History ==
William FitzSwale built West Woodhay Castle as a non-defensive timber motte-and-bailey structure during the early 12th century. (Note: The former timber structure known as West Woodhay Castle was determined to be too small to be a castle, therefore making it more likely to have been a moated hunting lodge.) The Castle was abandoned around 1300 when a larger manor house was constructed near the former castle by Almaric de St Amand, 1st Baron Saint Amand.

The mound was converted into a belvedere during the 17th century and became associated with West Woodhay House.

== Excavation ==
West Woodhay Castle was first excavated in the 1880s after being mistaken for a barrow, causing severe damage to the mound.

The mound was excavated again in 1935 and 1936 by Edwyn Jervoise, who discovered pottery ranging from the 12th to 14th centuries within the mound.

Neither excavation identified the location of the building on the central mound of West Woodhay Castle.
