= West Woodhay Down =

Protected area in Berkshire, England

- Site of Special Scientific Interest
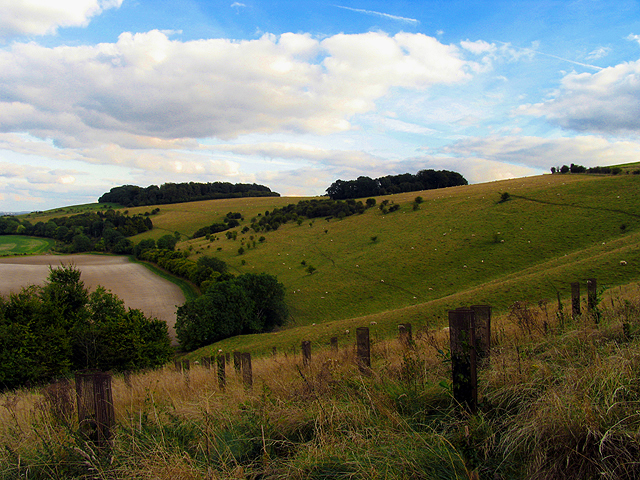

- Location within Berkshire
- Location of West Woodhay Down.
- Area of search: Berkshire; Hampshire
- Grid reference: SU 387 617
- Coordinates: 51.353°N 1.447°W
- Interest: Biological
- Area: 1.5 hectares (3.7 acres)
- Notification date: 1985
- Location map: Magic Map

West Woodhay Down is a 1.5-hectare (3.7-acre) biological Site of Special Scientific Interest in Berkshire and Hampshire. It is lowland Calcareous grassland with a northwest facing bank, and forms part of the northern slopes of Walbury Hill and Combe Hill. The site was formerly included as part of Inkpen and Walbury Hills SSSI.

West Woodhay Down is in the civil parishes of West Woodhay and East Woodhay, to the south-west of the town of Newbury. West Woodhay parish is within the unitary authority area of West Berkshire and the ceremonial county of Berkshire, whilst East Woodhay is within the district of Basingstoke and Deane in the administrative county of Hampshire.

== Flora ==
The site has the following Flora:

- Bromus erectus
- Blackstonia perfoliata
- Leontodon autumnalis
- Linum catharticum
- Galium cruciata
- Asperula cynanchica
- Primula veris
- Scabiosa columbaria
- Reseda lutea
- Sanguisorba minor
- Gymnadenia conopsea
- Anacamptis pyramidalis
- Helianthemum nummularium
- Centaurea scabiosa
- Campanula rotundifolia
- Listera ovata
- Herminium monorchis
- Coeloglossum viride
- Polygala calcarea
- Saxifraga granulata
- Crataegus
- Whitebeam
- Crataegus monogyna
