= Crockham =

Crockham may refer to the following places in England:

- Crockham Heath, village in Berkshire
- Crockham Hill, village in the Sevenoaks district of Kent
