= Enborne =

Coordinates: 51°22′59″N 1°21′58″W

- Village and civil parish
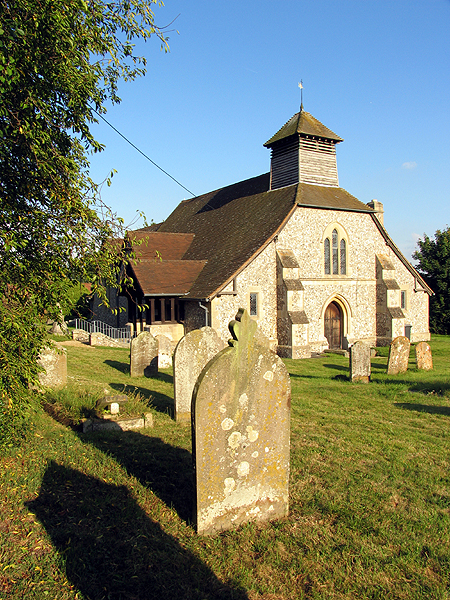
- St Michael's Church, Enborne

- Location within Berkshire
- Area: 8.85 km^{2} (3.42 sq mi)
- Population: 735 (2011 census)
  - Density: 83/km^{2} (210/sq mi)
- OS grid reference: SU4365
- Unitary authority: West Berkshire
- Ceremonial county: Berkshire
- Region: South East
- Country: England
- Sovereign state: United Kingdom
- Post town: NEWBURY
- Postcode district: RG20, RG14
- Dialling code: 01635
- Police: Thames Valley
- Fire: Royal Berkshire
- Ambulance: South Central
- UK Parliament: Newbury

Enborne is a village and civil parish, in West Berkshire, England. The River Enborne shares its name, although it does not run through the village; rather, it runs through and rises near the nearby village of Enborne Row. The village name has had many variant spellings in the past, including Anebourne in 1086, as well as Enbourne, Enborn and Enbourn in the last 200 years.

== Settlements ==
The parish lies immediately west of Newbury in West Berkshire, and contains the settlements of Redhill, Crockham Heath, Skinner's Green, Wheatlands Lane, Enborne Row and Wash Water. There is no main population centre; the settlements are scattered. It lost some of its eastern land to Newbury's 20th century expansion.

== Boundaries ==
The River Enborne marks the southern boundary of the parish, where Berkshire joins Hampshire. The northern boundary is the railway line. Newbury lies to the east, and the parish of Hamstead Marshall to the west. The Kennet & Avon Canal passes across the northern end of the parish, together with the River Kennet.

== Agriculture ==
The parish has always been, and still is, mostly agricultural in character, with substantial woodland and private parkland. However, in recent years, many of Enborne's former farmsteads have been redeveloped into housing.

== Geography ==
Enborne has a site of Special Scientific Interest (SSSI) just to the east of the village, called Enborne Copse and another to the south called Avery's Pightle.

=== Reddings Copse ===
Early records show, that at one time, up to at least 16 acres of Reddings copse in East Enborne, was held by the family of the barons de Pinkney and was granted by them to William de Clervaux or Nicholas Aufryke. By the middle of the thirteenth century De Clervaux had granted his lands in East Enborne to the Prior of Sandleford, Berkshire who also acquired the lands held by Aufryke. Reddings copse belonged to one or other of these. Sandleford Priory had it until the priory's property was taken over by the Dean and Canons of Windsor of St George's Chapel in the fifteenth century. Various records of the sale of woods or lease of Readings Coppice survive which indicate tenants between 1585 and 1748. In the nineteenth century a railway in a deep cutting was built through its heart and in 1996 the by then disused railway was replaced by a wider four-lane motorway with lay-bys.

- 19 February 1585. Sale by the Dean and Canons of Windsor, to Thomas Dannett of Boveney, Buckinghamshire, esquire, and John Kempe of East Enborne, yeoman, for £33 6s 8d, of 16 acres in Readinges Coppice, to cut (under certain conditions) and carry away before 1 July 1586, and leave what the law requires.
- 4 November 1618. Lease by the Dean and Canons of Windsor, to John Dean of Sandleford, gentleman, of Reddings coppice and a close lately planted with underwood, for 21 years at £4. With Bond for £30 to hold the Dean and Canons of Windsor harmless against Robert Deale of Henwick, Elizabeth his wife and John Deale junior, his son. Another bond for £20. Counterpart. Witnesses: Robert Boswell, William Brofarton.
- 16 March 1624. Renewal of lease of Reddings Coppice, by the Dean and Canons of Windsor, to John Dean of Sandleford, gentleman, of Reddings coppice and a close lately planted with underwood, for 21 years at £4. Witnesses: William Here, John Combes.
- 28 July 1663. Lease by the Dean and Canons of Windsor, to John Seely of (Newbery) Newbury, woolen draper, of Reddings coppice and a close lately planted with underwood. Witnesses: Francis Ridley, William Isaacks, Thomas Monck.
- 10 May 1670. Renewal of lease of Reddings Coppice by the Dean and Canons of Windsor, to John Seely [died 1678] of Newbury, woolen draper, of Reddings coppice and a close lately planted with underwood.
- 18 December 1685. Lease of Reddings Coppice by the Dean and Canons of Windsor, to Eleanor Seely of Greenham, Berkshire, widow, of Reddings coppice and a close lately planted with underwood. Endorsed with her surrender 23 June 1690 for a new lease to John Edmunds of Newbury, gentleman. Counterpart. Witnesses to lease: Ellenor [Eleanor] Sealy, William Baron, Joseph Guy, William Shower. Witnesses to the endorsement: Seth Lyferd, No. Starling, John Foster, Thomas Jemmell.
- 12 July 1705 Lease of Reddings Coppice by the Dean and Canons of Windsor, to Benjamin Edmunds of the City of London, merchant. Counterpart. Witnesses: Benjamin Avery, Richard Avery, Richard Holmes junior.
- 25 May 1720. Lease of Reddings Coppice by the Dean and Canons of Windsor, to Jane Edmonds of Clapham, widow, sole executrix of Benjamin Edmunds, for £4, no beasts or cattle to be put in but calves and colts only. Counterpart. Witnesses: John Godwin, John Perry.
- 6 March 1748. Renewal of lease of Reddings Coppice by the Dean and Canons of Windsor, to Jane Edmonds, widow. Counterpart. Witnesses: George North, at Merchant Taylors' Hall, London, William Bateson, his clerk.
- Report from Mr Chamber as to Sandleford, let to Mr Montague, Overtons and Redding Coppice to Mrs Edmonds, and Court lands in Enborne, and copyhold land in Pamber called Hop gillons.

== Transport ==
Enborne is served by bus service 13 from Hungerford to Newbury. Enborne has never had a railway station but the now-closed Woodhay was closer than Newbury's, 2 miles (3.2 km) away today. From the 1880s to the 1960s Enborne Junction marked the forking off of the Didcot, Newbury and Southampton Railway from the Berkshire and Hampshire Line of the Great Western Railway. The route of the disused DN&SR line became much of the Newbury bypass (A34). The protest against the building of the by-pass in the late 1990s was technically in the parish.

== Notable buildings ==
Enborne's parish church is of 12th-century origin, dedicated to St Michael and All Angels, it is a Grade I listed building. There is a Church of England primary school, founded in the 1820s. There is also a pub, the Craven Arms, which certainly dates back to the early 18th century and probably much earlier.

== History ==
=== Robin Hood ===
- Robin Hood, William Robehod, aka Robert le Fevre, from Enborne in Berkshire. Hood was indicted for various things, 1261–62, took flight, outlawed, and his chattels taken without warrant by the prior of Sandleford. Easter 1262 the prior was excused a fine by the king for having confiscated Hood's chattels. One of the Henry III rolls of Easter 1262, reads:

Rex mandavit baronibus de scaccario per breve quod perdonavit priori de Sandelford' j marcam as quam amerciatus fuit coram Gilbert de Preston' et sociis suis justicariis ultimo itinerantibus in Comitatu Berk' pro eo quod idem prior seisivit sine waranto catalla Willelmi Robehod' fugitivi, et ideo quod ipsum inde quietus esse faciant.

Translation:

The king commanded the barons of the exchequer by writ that he had forgiven the prior of Sandelford j a mark which he had redeemed before Gilbert de Preston and his associates of the justices last itinerant in the county of Berk, for that the same prior had stopped without a warrant to seize the fugitive William Robehod, and therefore that they should cause him to be quiet from there.

== Demography ==
2011 Published Statistics: Population, home ownership and extracts from Physical Environment, surveyed in 2005
Output area	Homes owned outright	Owned with a loan	Socially rented	Privately rented	Other	Usual residents	km^{2}
Civil parish	94	105	25	33	2	735	8.85
