= Wash Water =

Village in Berkshire, England

Coordinates: 51.369152°N 1.357884°W

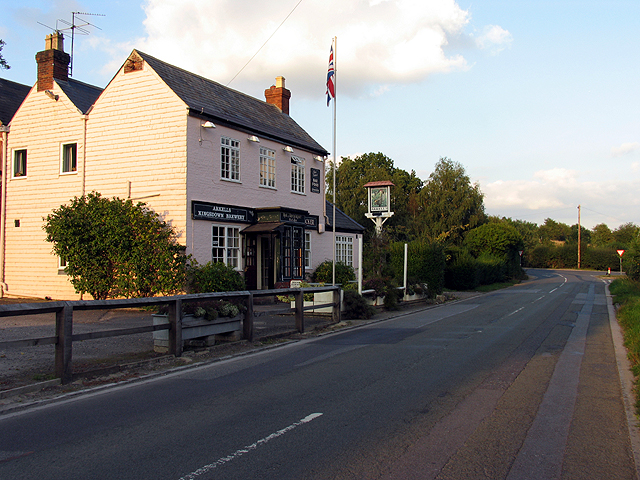
- The Woodpecker public house near Wash Water

- Location within Berkshire
- OS grid reference: SU451635
- Metropolitan borough: West Berkshire
- Metropolitan county: Berkshire
- Region: South East
- Country: England
- Sovereign state: United Kingdom
- Post town: NEWBURY
- Postcode district: RG10
- Dialling code: 01635
- Police: Thames Valley
- Fire: Royal Berkshire
- Ambulance: South Central
- UK Parliament: Berkshire

Wash Water is a hamlet on the border of Berkshire, and Hampshire. It is divided between the civil parishes of Enborne (where according to Grid Refs the majority of the population at the 2011 Census was included), Newbury, Highclere and East Woodhay. The settlement lies adjacent to the A343 and A34 highways (Newbury Bypass), approximately 3 miles (4.8 km) south-south-west of Newbury.

Some locals claim it is named after the spot on the River Enborne where women washed the troops' clothes during or after the First Battle of Newbury of the English Civil War, others say it is because wool was washed in the local rivers before fulling in the two nearby mills.

Village facilities include a public house called the Woodpecker Inn, formerly the Derby Arms.
