= Matthew Darby-Griffith =

British Army general

Matthew Chitty Darby-Griffith (born Darby; 1772 Newtown, Hampshire –1823) was a British Army Major-General.

He was a son of Vice-Admiral George Darby and Mary daughter of Sir William St Quintin, 4th Baronet. He took the additional name of Griffith upon inheriting the estate of Padworth in the English county of Berkshire.

Darby's thirty years' service in the Grenadier Guards included much action during the Napoleonic Wars. He lost his leg at the Battle of Corunna in Spain in 1809, and was awarded the War Medal with one clasp for the part he played there.

He died on 7 August 1823 at Padworth House. He had married Lousia, daughter of Thomas Hankey Esq. of Fetcham Park, Surrey, and they became the parents of three sons and one daughter, including Christopher Darby-Griffith, MP and General Henry Darby-Griffith, CB.

== Bibliography ==
- Hart's Annual Army List. (1863)
- Royal Berkshire History: Matthew Chitty Darby-Griffith (1772-1823)
