= Woodhay railway station =

Defunct railway station in Hampshire, England

Coordinates: 51.3679°N 1.3650°W

Woodhay
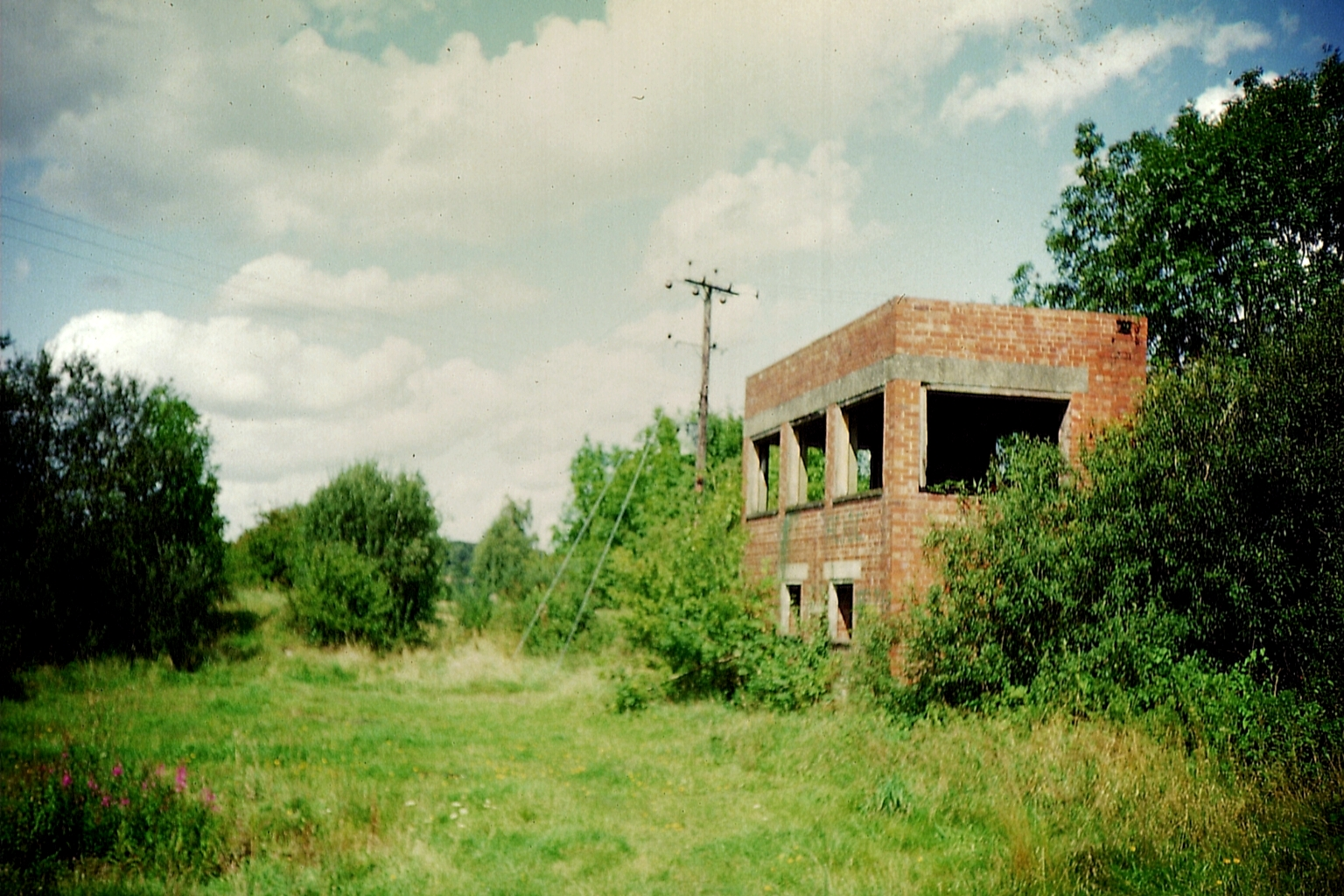
- The site of the station in 1992

General information
- Location: East Woodhay, Basingstoke and Deane; England
- Grid reference: SU443634
- Platforms: 2

Other information
- Status: Disused

History
- Original company: Didcot, Newbury and Southampton Railway
- Pre-grouping: Didcot, Newbury and Southampton Railway
- Post-grouping: Great Western Railway

Key dates
- 4 May 1885: Opened
- 4 August 1942: Closed
- 8 March 1943: Re-opened
- 7 March 1960: Closed to passengers
- 31 December 1962: Closed to freight
Location

Woodhay railway station was a station on the Didcot, Newbury and Southampton Railway in England. It was located about five miles south of the junction with the Great Western Railway west of Newbury railway station. Woodhay station served the villages of Enborne and Enborne Row in Berkshire and Broad Laying (Woolton Hill) in the parish of East Woodhay, Hampshire. It was a considerable distance from the villages of East Woodhay and West Woodhay. The site now lies under the A34 Newbury by-pass.

== Facilities ==
Like most country stations on the line it originally consisted of two platforms, the southbound platform on the passing loop. Since the station was built on a bank it was not possible to construct strong foundations for a brick-built station building. Hence this was the only station on the line with a wooden station building located on the southbound platform. Two sidings and a headshunt were built to the south of the station for goods. These were primarily used for horses and wood cut from nearby pine forests.

== Accidents and incidents ==
- In December 1957, a freight train hauled by BR Standard Class 4 2-6-0 No. 76016 overran signals and was derailed by trap points.

== Closure ==
Both the station and the railway was closed in the 1960s.

== Routes ==
Preceding station	Disused railways	Following station
Newbury; Line closed, station open	Great Western Railway; Didcot, Newbury and Southampton Railway	Highclere; Line and station closed

== Typical timetable ==
Page 45 of the 1910 Bradshaw's railway timetable gives the train times:

Woodhay - Newbury

- 08:22 - 08:29
- 08:53 - 09:00
- 11:52 - 11:59
- 13:12 - 13:19
- 15:45 - 15:53
- 17:45 - 17:53
- 18:53 - 19:00

Newbury - Woodhay

- 07:48 - 07:57
- 08:59 - 09:07
- 11:42 - 11:53
- 13:55 - 14:03
- 16:15 - 16:25
- 19:00 - 19:08
- 20:47 - 20:55
