= Woolton Hill =

Village and parish in Hampshire, England

Coordinates: 51.353°N 1.384°W

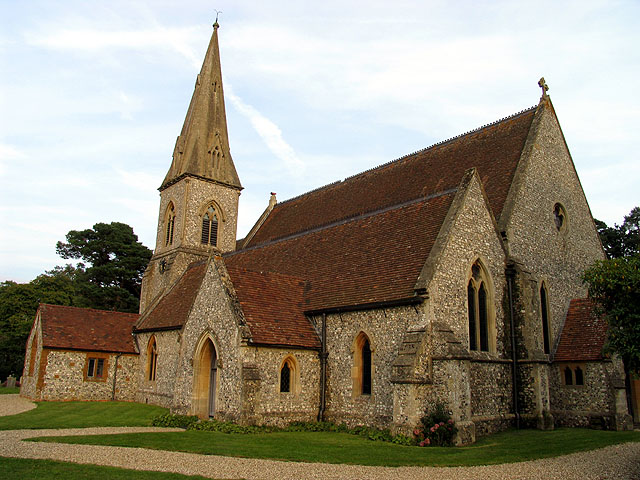
- St Thomas' Church, Woolton Hill

- Location within Hampshire
- OS grid reference: SU430617
- Civil parish: East Woodhay
- District: Basingstoke and Deane
- Shire county: Hampshire
- Region: South East
- Country: England
- Sovereign state: United Kingdom
- Post town: NEWBURY
- Postcode district: RG20
- Dialling code: 01635
- Police: Hampshire and Isle of Wight
- Fire: Hampshire and Isle of Wight
- Ambulance: South Central
- UK Parliament: North West Hampshire
- Website: Village

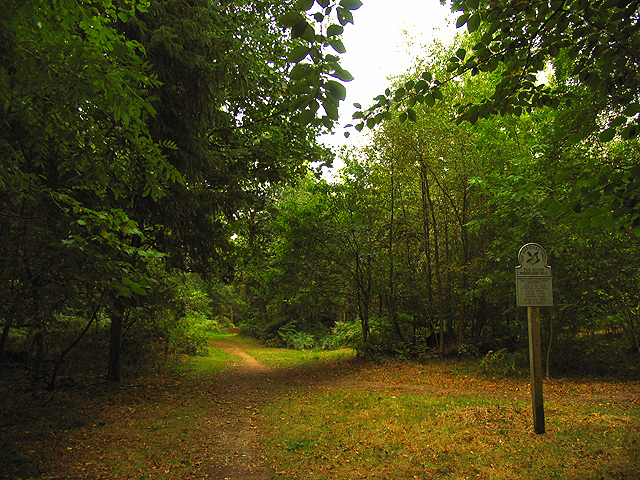
The Chase

Woolton Hill is a village in Hampshire, England, in the civil parish of East Woodhay. The village lies approximately 4 miles (6 km) south-west of the centre of Newbury.

== History ==
The area was farmland, woodland and scattered houses until the mid-19th century, when the new church was built (as a 'daughter church' to the much older ecclesiastical parish of East Woodhay). The village grew rapidly during and since the 1950s and is now larger (in population terms) than the neighbouring and contiguous village of Highclere. Due to the village's proximity to the A34 road it was the scene of many demonstrations during "the third battle of Newbury" when the Newbury bypass was being built in the 1990s.

In the 19th century, Broad Laying was a hamlet to the north-east of Woolton Hill. The northern part of the built-up area is now known as Broad Layings.

== Transport ==
There are bus services to Newbury and Andover. Woodhay railway station used to serve the village on the Didcot, Newbury and Southampton Railway until the line's closure in the 1960s. The disused railway line became, in part, the route for the A34 Newbury bypass.

== Governance ==
The village is within the civil parish of East Woodhay and the East Woodhay ward of Basingstoke and Deane Borough Council. The borough council is a non-metropolitan district of Hampshire County Council.

== Amenities ==
The village has St Thomas' CofE Infant School and Woolton Hill Junior School.

To the east/north-east of the village is an area of woodland known as "The Chase" which is managed by the National Trust. The Chase was significantly altered in 2010–2011, to return it to a nature reserve as per its original gift terms. A local watercourse runs through The Chase and has been dammed to form a small lake in the north-eastern end. There is an asphalted car-park. The Chase is bounded by the A34 (Newbury bypass) to the north-east.

The village has a local shop, a post office at Post Office Stores at Broadlayings and a church hall, called Woolton Hill Church Hall.

== Landmarks ==
Gainsborough Stud, owned by Mohammed bin Rashid Al Maktoum (ruler of Dubai), is in Woolton Hill. The stud's land covers a large area in the village.
