= Avery's Pightle =

Protected area in Berkshire, England

- Site of Special Scientific Interest
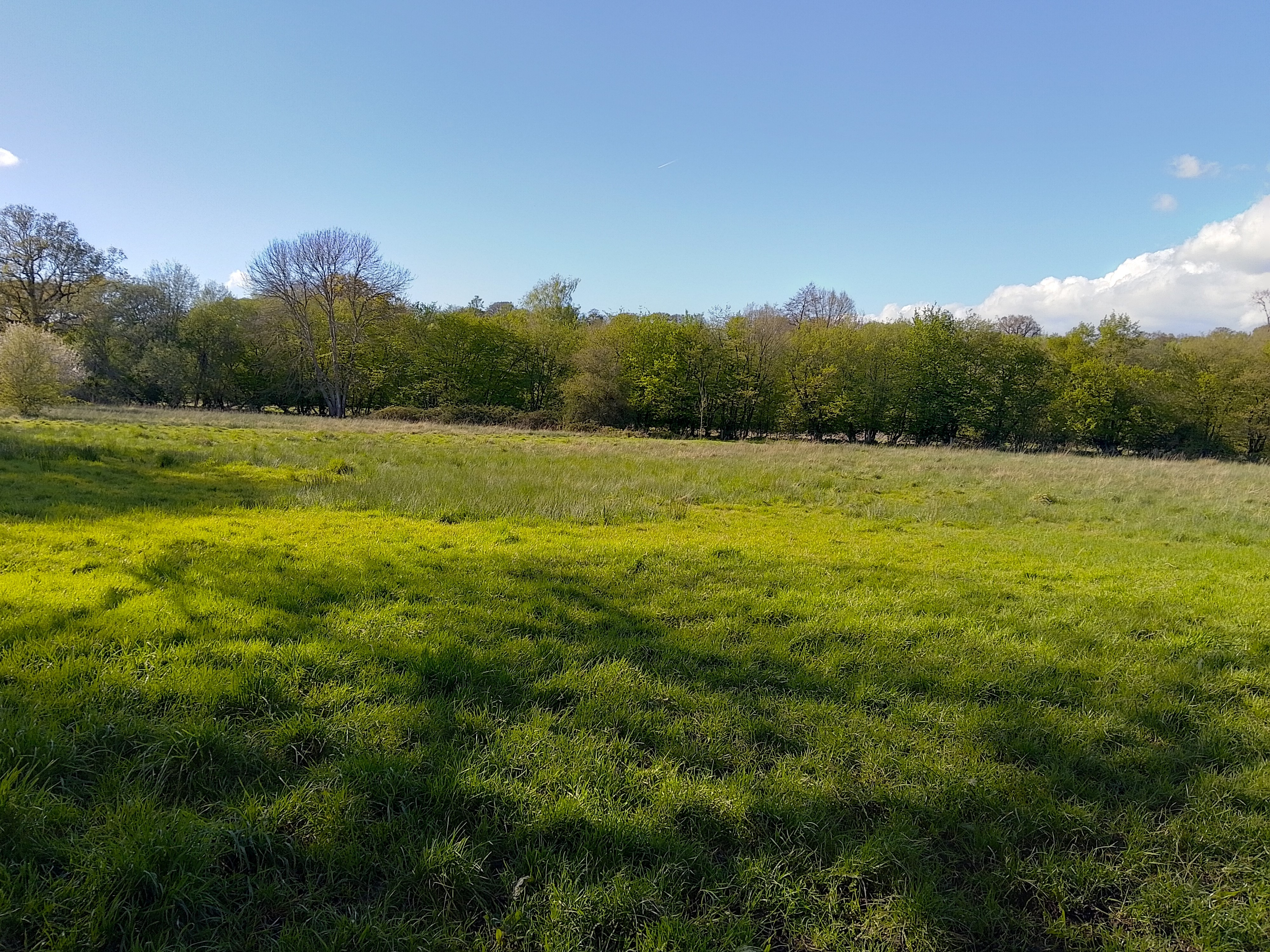

- Location within Berkshire
- Location of Avery's Pightle.
- Area of search: Berkshire
- Grid reference: SU 435 651
- Coordinates: 51.383°N 1.376°W
- Interest: Biological
- Area: 1.3 hectares (3.2 acres)
- Notification date: 1985
- Location map: Magic Map

Avery's Pightle is a 1.3-hectare (3.2-acre) biological Site of Special Scientific Interest south of Enborne in Berkshire. It is managed by the Berkshire, Buckinghamshire and Oxfordshire Wildlife Trust.

This unimproved meadow is species rich and it has surviving ridge and furrow, suggesting a long history of traditional management without modern herbicides or fertilisers. Twenty-four species of grass and a hundred and thirteen herbs have been recorded. There is a wet ditch which has water whorl grass.

There is access to the site from Church Lane.
