= Benjamin Rudyerd =

English poet and politician

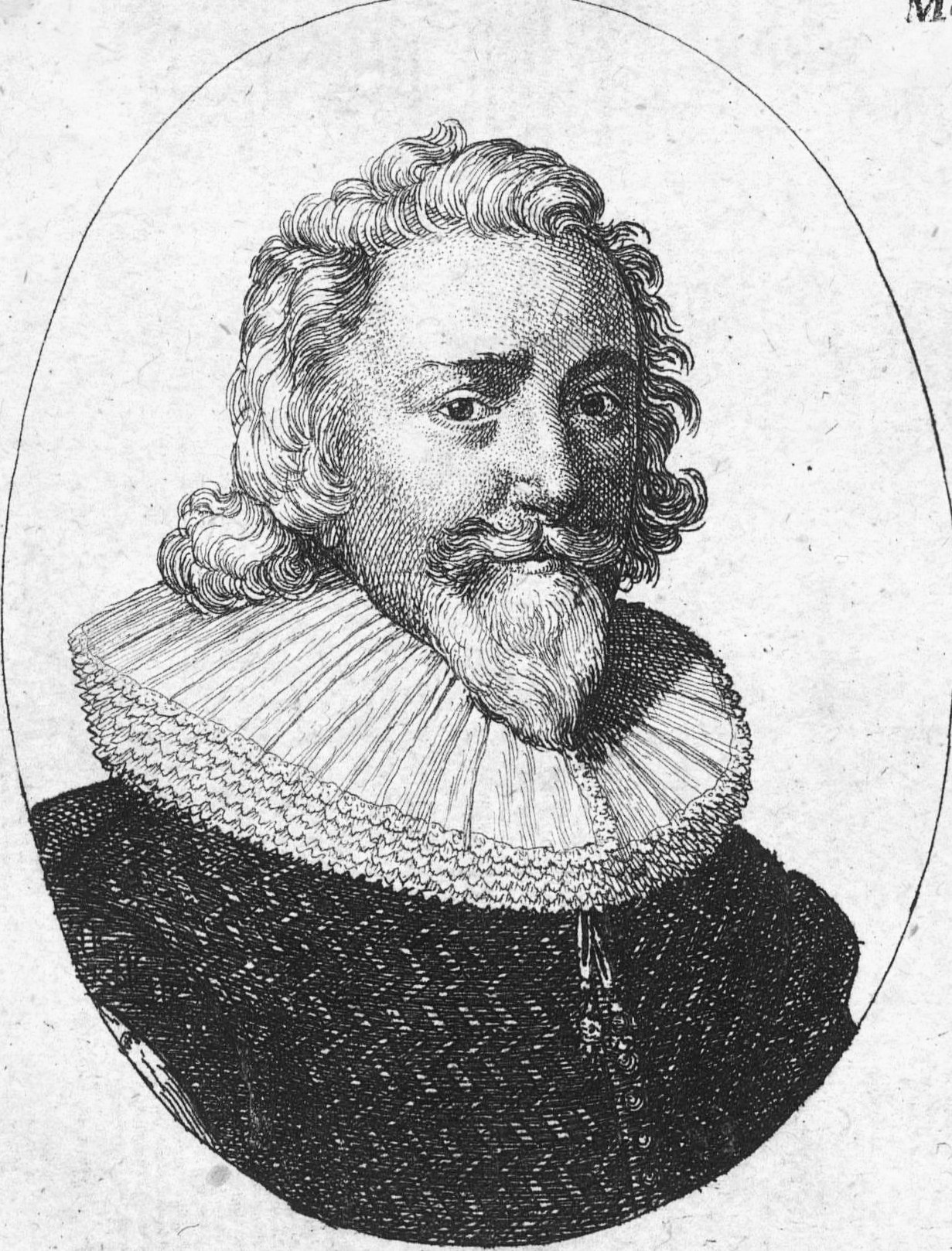
Contemporary engraving of Benjamin Rudyerd by Wenceslas Hollar

Sir Benjamin Rudyerd or Rudyard (1572 – 31 May 1658) was an English poet and politician who sat in the House of Commons at various times between 1621 and 1648. He was also a colonial investor who was one of the incorporators of the Providence Company in 1630. He was a moderate supporter of the Parliamentary cause in the English Civil War.

== Background and early life ==
Rudyerd was the son of James Rudyerd of Hartley Wintney, Hampshire. He was educated at Winchester College and St John's College, Oxford, and then joined the Middle Temple, where he was called to the bar in 1600.

== Poetry ==
As a young man Rudyerd's poetry, though not printed until after his death, won him many plaudits, and he was also respected as a critic. He became a close friend of the poet and playwright Ben Jonson, who addressed three published epigrams to him in 1616, the first of which began:

Rudyerd, as lesser dames to great ones use,
My lighter comes to kiss thy learned muse

Rudyerd was also an associate of John Owen and John Hoskins (who once wounded him in a duel, although they later became firm friends). More valuable to him, however, was the admiration of the Earl of Pembroke, England's leading patron of the arts, who helped promote Rudyerd's political career. Rudyerd's most important surviving poems are a series written in answer to poems by the Earl.

== Political career ==
In 1618, Rudyerd was knighted, and appointed for life to the lucrative post of Surveyor of the Court of Wards. (When the post was abolished in 1647, Parliament voted him £6,000 in compensation for its loss.) He had a long career in parliament and most of the constituencies for which he sat were ones where the Pembroke influence was strong. In 1621, he was elected Member of Parliament for Portsmouth. He was re-elected MP for Portsmouth in 1624 and 1625. At first, Rudyerd was generally supportive of the court, in line with the policy of his patron Pembroke, and by 1624 seems to have been the government's unofficial spokesman in the Commons. He continued to support Buckingham after the accession of Charles I. In 1626 he was elected MP for Old Sarum and although he was one of the MPs named to assist in Buckingham's impeachment in 1626 took no public part in the trial. He was elected MP for Downton in 1628 and sat until 1629 when King Charles decided to rule without parliament for eleven years. By the end of the decade, he was less supportive of the Crown, taking a strongly critical line on the redress of grievances and denying the King's right to arrest without showing cause. Nevertheless, he assumed the role of mediator between the King and Parliament, arguing in a speech "This is the crisis of Parliaments: we shall know by this if parliaments live or die. If we persevere, the King to draw one way, the parliament another, the Commonwealth must sink in the midst."

During the interval between the Parliaments of 1629 and 1640, Rudyerd became interested in colonial developments in North America, and in 1630 was a co-founder of the Providence Company. In 1634 he purchased the manor of West Woodhay, Berkshire.

In April 1640 Rudyerd was elected MP for Wilton in the Short Parliament. He resumed his role of mediator, speaking on the first day of debate in the Short Parliament and concluding that "I would desire nothing more than that we proceed with such moderation as the parliament may be the mother of many more happy parliaments". In November 1640 he was re-elected MP for Wilton in the Long Parliament. His first speech in the Long Parliament was less conciliatory and was a vigorous attack on the King's "evil counsellors".

Rudyerd took the Parliamentary side on the outbreak of the Civil War, but does not seem to have been an enthusiastic supporter of the cause, and his attendance in the House was twice specially ordered. In 1643, he was one of the MPs appointed to the Westminster Assembly and in the same years was also a member of the council appointed by the Long Parliament in 1643 for the government of the English colonies. He was opposed to the trial of the King and was excluded from Parliament in Pride's Purge, after which he retired from public life. His time in parliament was long and, in the words of Brunton & Pennington, "unhampered by political consistency" though contemporaries nicknamed him the silver trumpet of Parliaments for his pleasing oratory.

Rudyerd died at the age of about 86 at West Woodhay House, Berkshire, in 1658.

Rudyerd married Elizabeth Harington, daughter of Sir Henry Harington and a relation of the Earl of Pembroke.

Parliament of England
Preceded by John Griffith; George Thorpe	Member of Parliament for Portsmouth; 1621–1625; With: Sir Daniel Norton 1621–1622; Sir William Uvedale 1624; Sir Daniel Norton 1625	Succeeded by Sir James Fullerton; Thomas Whatman
Preceded by Michael Oldisworth; Sir John Stradling, Bt	Member of Parliament for Old Sarum; 1626; With: Michael Oldisworth	Succeeded by Michael Oldisworth; Christopher Keightley
Preceded by Edward Herbert; Sir William Trumbull	Member of Parliament for Downton; 1628–1629; With: Edward Herbert	Parliament suspended until 1640
Vacant Parliament suspended since 1629	Member of Parliament for Wilton; 1640–1648; With: Sir Henry Vane	Succeeded by Sir Henry Vane
