= Greenham and Crookham Commons =

Protected area in Berkshire, England

- Site of Special Scientific Interest
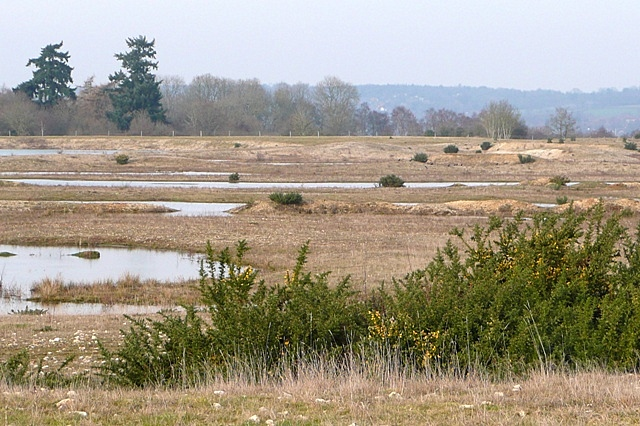
- Crookham Common

- Location within Berkshire
- Location of Greenham and Crookham Commons.
- Area of search: Berkshire
- Grid reference: SU 501 644
- Coordinates: 51.376°N 1.282°W
- Interest: Biological
- Area: 280.5 hectares (693 acres)
- Notification date: 1994
- Location map: Magic Map

Greenham and Crookham Commons are two adjoining public park areas of 280.5-hectare (693-acre) common land designated as a biological Site of Special Scientific Interest (SSSI) in the civil parishes of Greenham and Thatcham, on the southern outskirts of Newbury in the English county of Berkshire, home to a variety of rare wildlife (such as the Northern pool frog).

== Public park ==
In 1997, Greenham and Crookham Commons were designated as public parkland. Cattle from local farms are permitted to graze the Commons and often stray onto the adjacent Burys Bank Road.

== Site of Special Scientific Interest ==
The SSSI is in several areas and it is part of the 444-hectare (1,100-acre) Greenham and Crookham Commons nature reserve, which is owned by West Berkshire Council and managed by the Berkshire, Buckinghamshire and Oxfordshire Wildlife Trust.

The two commons have the largest area of heathland and acid grassland in the county and other habitats are gorse scrub, broadleaved woodland and water-logged alder valleys. There is a rich variety of invertebrates, such as the white admiral, purple emperor and silver-washed fritillary woodland butterflies.

== History ==
=== Pre-20th century ===
The area has been common grazing land for the parishes since Norman times. Besides the grazing of local animals, the commons were used for troop movements during the English Civil War and in the eighteen and nineteenth centuries.

=== World War II and Cold War ===
The area became a Royal Air Force station called RAF Greenham Common in 1942; it was used by both the Royal Air Force and United States Army Air Forces during the Second World War and the United States Air Force during the Cold War, also as a base for nuclear weapons. In the 1980s, the commons therefore became the location of the Women's Peace Camp, but following the closure of the base in September 1992, it was opened to the public as a nature reserve in April 2000.
