= West Woodhay House =

Building in Berkshire, England

Coordinates: 51.367°N 1.44827°W

West Woodhay House is a Grade I listed building in the parish of West Woodhay, West Berkshire, UK.

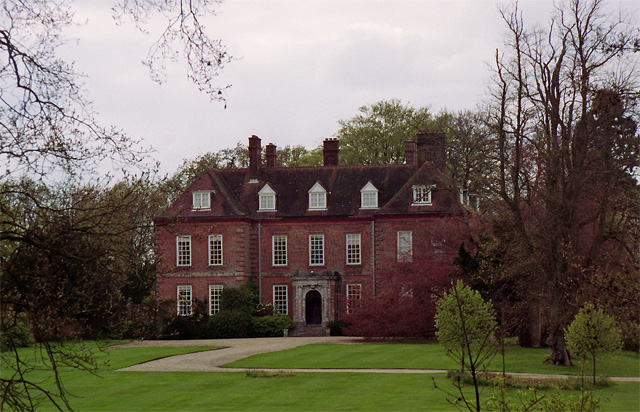
West Woodhay House

== History and description ==
The house was erected in 1635 and is attributed to Inigo Jones, although it is likely to have been designed and built by Edward Carter. East facing, it looks over a lawn and an ornamental lake beyond. It has two storeys of red brick with a central hall and projecting end wings. The porch has a rounded arch, which is flanked by Ionic pillars. Over the porch doorway is the date 1635 with the motto, Nisi Dominus aedificet Frustra, a shortened version of Psalm 127, verse 1: Without the Lord, he builds in vain, which, slightly altered, is also the motto of the city of Edinburgh.

The poet and politician Sir Benjamin Rudyerd lived in the house and died there in 1658.

In the eighteenth century, West Woodhay House was owned by William Sloper, MP, followed by his son William Sloper, who lived there with the soprano Susannah Cibber following her estrangement from her husband and accompanying lawsuit.

The house passed into the hands of the Cole family and was inherited by the notorious prankster Horace de Vere Cole on the death of his grandmother in 1906. He was unable to afford its upkeep so he sold it in 1912 to his uncle, Alfred Clayton Cole, later Governor of the Bank of England.
