= West Woodhay =

Coordinates: 51°21′58″N 1°25′55″W

- Village and civil parish
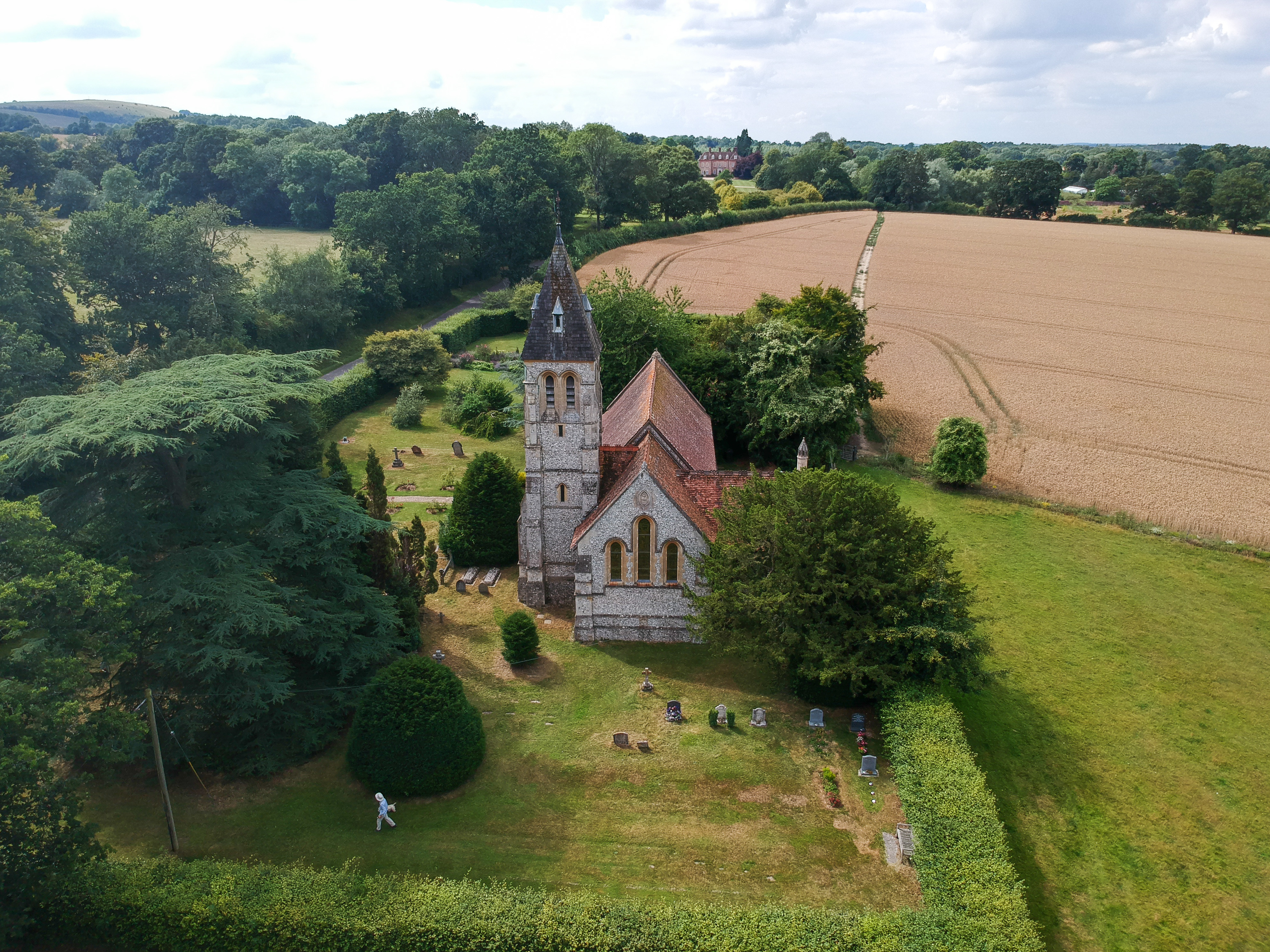
- St Laurence's Church, with West Woodhay House in the background

- Location within Berkshire
- Area: 14.75 km^{2} (5.70 sq mi)
- Population: 122 (2011 census including Combe)
  - Density: 8/km^{2} (21/sq mi)
- OS grid reference: SU396632
- Civil parish: West Woodhay
- Unitary authority: West Berkshire
- Ceremonial county: Berkshire
- Region: South East
- Country: England
- Sovereign state: United Kingdom
- Post town: NEWBURY
- Postcode district: RG20
- Dialling code: 01488
- Police: Thames Valley
- Fire: Royal Berkshire
- Ambulance: South Central
- UK Parliament: Newbury

West Woodhay (/ˈwʊdi/ "woody") is a rural scattered village and civil parish in West Berkshire, England. At the 2011 census it had 59 households.

== Geography ==
The area is more elevated compared to the rest of the county of Berkshire and the district. It is undulating and has the main source of the River Enborne. It has a border to the south with Hampshire and is centred 3 miles (4.8 km) west south-west of Newbury, between Inkpen and East Woodhay. The eastern slopes of Walbury Hill, the highest point in South East England fall within its bounds as is the adjoining West Woodhay Down, a Site of Special Scientific Interest.

== Places of Interest ==
=== West Woodhay House ===
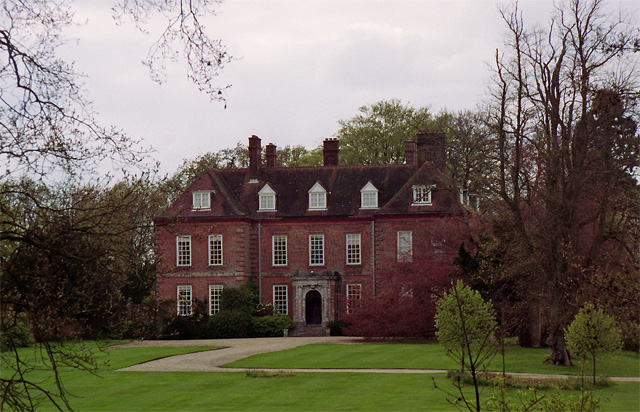
West Woodhay House

Located west of the village is West Woodhay House, which is a Grade I listed building, that was erected in 1635. Notable residents of the house have included poet and politician Benjamin Rudyerd, soprano Susannah Cibber and the notorious prankster Horace de Vere Cole.

=== St Laurence's Church ===
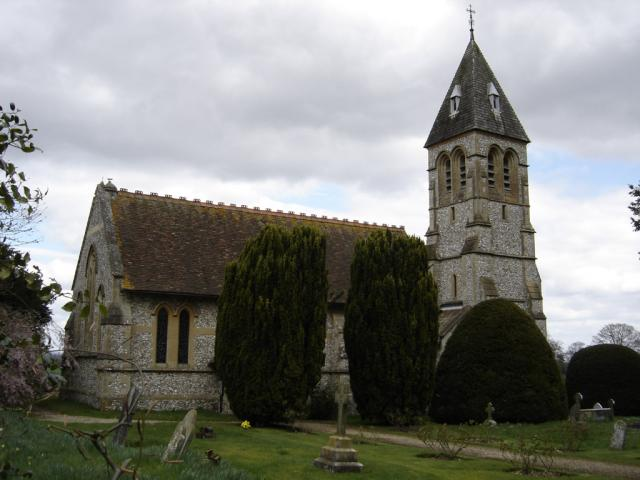
St Laurence's Church

The present church, St Laurence's, is the third church to stand in the village, with the first record of a church in West Woodhay in 1332. By the early 18th century, the medieval building was in a damaged state, and was replaced in 1717 by a new church. This church was located in the grounds of West Woodhay House, and was designed by John Vanbrugh. The 1717 building was demolished and replaced in 1882/3 with the current church, designed by Arthur Blomfield, which stands on a slightly different site to the church preceding it. The current Grade II listed church is built in flint and Bath stone, and consists of a chancel, aisleless nave, south porch and bell tower on the south side. The tower contains two bells, one of which is from the 1717 church, cast by the foundry in Aldbourne. A Willis Organ was added in 1902. The church today forms part of the Church of England Walbury Beacon benefice.

=== Motte ===
The remains of a small medieval motte lie in woodland near the village centre. The mound is 30 feet (9.1 m) in diameter, and 8 feet (2.4 m) high. Pottery found near the motte suggests possible occupation between the 12th and 14th centuries, and it may have been used as a moated hunting lodge. There is no indication of building on the central mound. It was excavated in the 1880s (possibly after being mistaken for a barrow), and excavated again in 1935–6.

== Demography ==
2011 Published Statistics: Population, home ownership and extracts from Physical Environment, surveyed in 2005
Output area	Homes owned outright	Owned with a loan	Socially rented	Privately rented	Other	km^{2} roads	km^{2} water	km^{2} domestic gardens	Usual residents	km^{2}
Civil parish	12	7	1	33	6	0.096	0.025	0.061	122	14.75
