= Enborne Copse =

Protected area in Berkshire, England

- Site of Special Scientific Interest
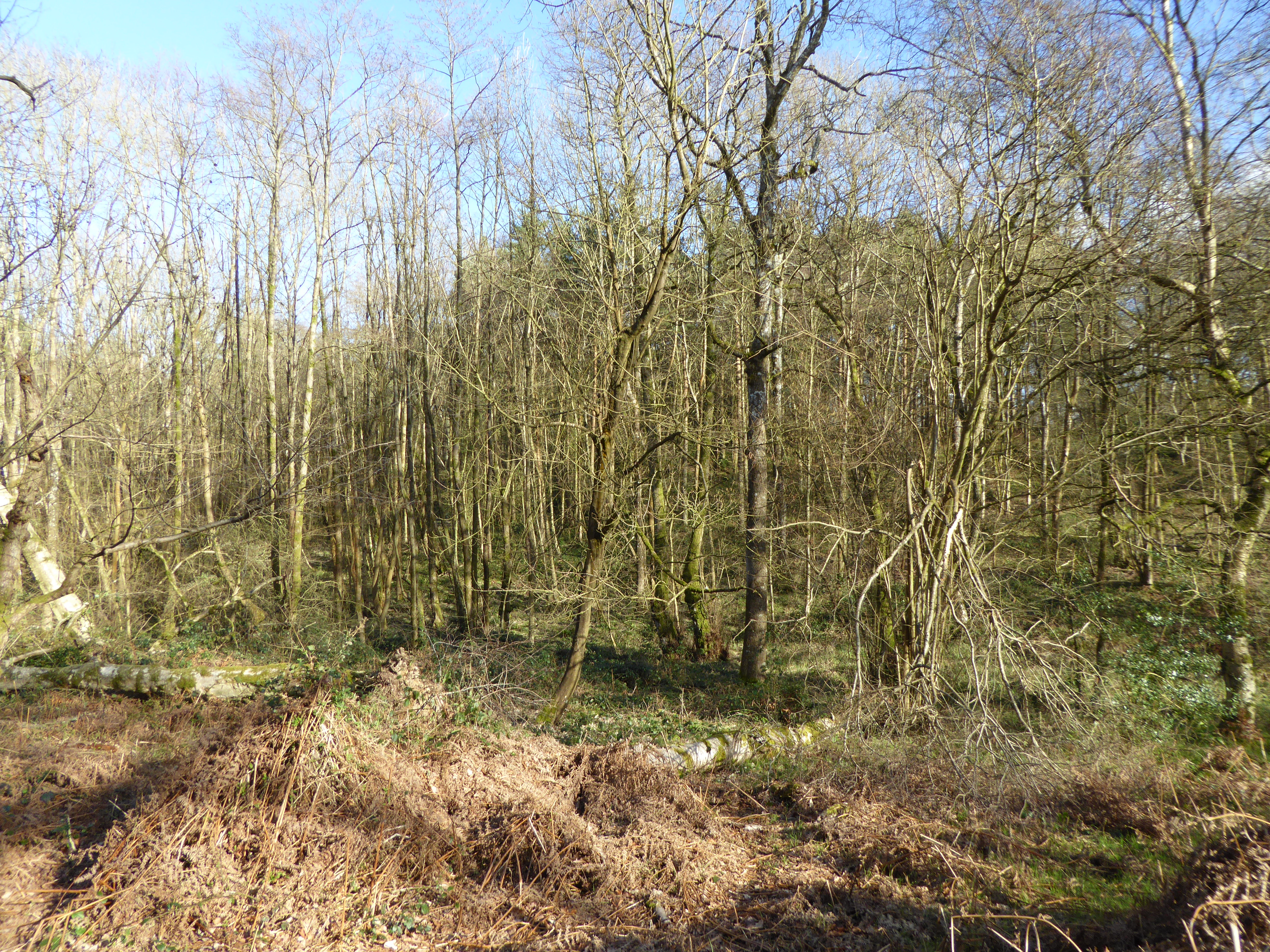

- Location within Berkshire
- Location of Enborne Copse.
- Area of search: Berkshire
- Grid reference: SU 433 660
- Coordinates: 51.391°N 1.379°W
- Interest: Biological
- Area: 11.9 hectares (29 acres)
- Notification date: 1985
- Location map: Magic Map

Enborne Copse is a 11.9-hectare (29-acre) biological Site of Special Scientific Interest west of Newbury in Berkshire. It is a Nature Conservation Review site.

The current woodland boundary is almost identical to that shown on Rocque's map of Berkshire in 1761, but most of it is now a conifer plantation and only the area designated as an SSSI retains its semi-natural broad leaved woodland.

== Flora ==
The site has the following flora:

=== Trees ===
- Betula pubescens
- Fraxinus
- Tilia cordata
- Quercus robur
- Hazel
- Alder
- Salix caprea
- Viburnum opulus
- Sorbus aucuparia
- Sambucus nigra
- Frangula alnus
- Malus sylvestris
- Quercus cerris

=== Other plants ===
- Convallaria majalis
- Primula vulgaris
- Polygonatum multiflorum
- Euphorbia amygdaloides
- Lamium galeobdolon
- Hyacinthoides non-scripta
- Oxalis
