= Crockham Heath =

Coordinates: 51°22′51″N 1°22′42″W

- Hamlet
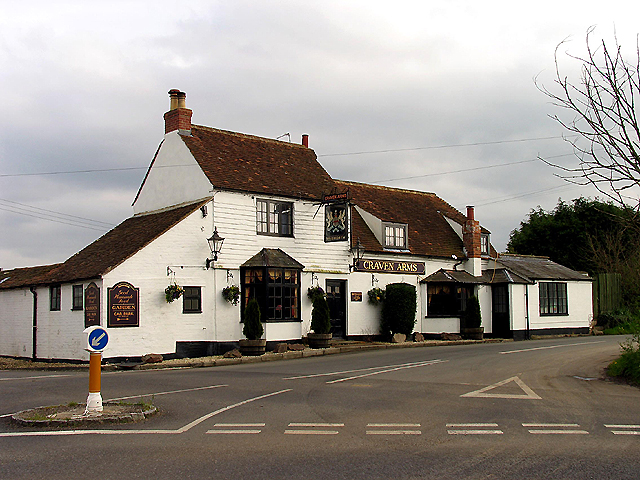
- The Craven Arms public house near Crockham Heath

- Location within Berkshire
- OS grid reference: SU435647
- Metropolitan borough: West Berkshire
- Metropolitan county: Berkshire
- Region: South East
- Country: England
- Sovereign state: United Kingdom
- Post town: Newbury
- Postcode district: RG20
- Dialling code: 01635
- Police: Thames Valley
- Fire: Royal Berkshire
- Ambulance: South Central
- UK Parliament: Berkshire

Crockham Heath is a hamlet in Berkshire, England. Crockham Heath is part of the civil parish of Enborne (where according to the grid ref the majority of the 2011 Census population was included). The settlement lies near to the A34 road, and is located approximately 3 miles (4.8 km) south-west of Newbury.

== Civil War ==
Crockham Heath was mentioned as being one of two unenclosed pieces of land in the battlefield during the First Battle of Newbury in the English Civil War in 1648. It was used as an assembly point for a small number of Royalist soldiers and it was claimed that Prince Rupert routed the Parliamentary cavalry who had attempted to attack it to disrupt the Royal supply line. However, despite eyewitness accounts talking about a little heath south of Enbourne, the historian Walter Money argued that the heath could not have been Crockham Heath due to the fact it was too small and too low to have supplied an army located on a hill and could have been easily taken. Money argued that it meant Enbourne Heath.

Other sources claim that it was the Parliamentarians who had used Crockham Heath with Robert Devereux, 3rd Earl of Essex using it to camp the day before the battle though he camped in a nearby house. Some Victorian historians claimed they slept in battle order but there are no contemporary sources that make that claim.

== Listed buildings ==
There are two listed buildings in Crockham Heath. One is a Grade II 18th century farmhouse listed in 1983 and a Grade II listed pair of cottages on Church Lane. The names of men from Crockham Heath who fought during the First World War are inscribed on Newbury's War Memorial.
