= RAF Greenham Common =

Former Royal Air Force flying base in Berkshire, England

RAF Greenham Common
- Near Newbury, Berkshire in England
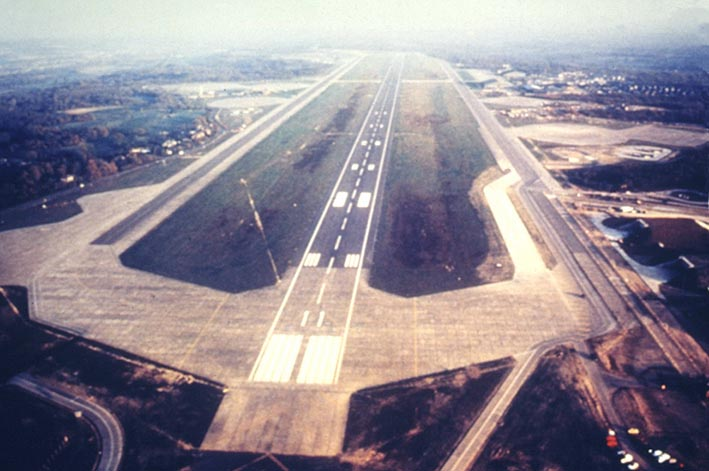
- RAF Greenham Common during the 1980s

Site information
- Type: Royal Air Force station
- Owner: Ministry of Defence
- Operator: Royal Air Force; US Army Air Forces (1943–1945); US Air Force (1951–1992)
- Condition: Closed

Location
- Location within Berkshire RAF Greenham Common (the United Kingdom)
- Coordinates: 51°22′43″N 001°16′56″W
- Grid reference: SU500645

Site history
- Built: 1943
- In use: 1943–1993
- Fate: Technical site now a business park; Remainder of station a public parkland known as Greenham and Crookham Commons
- Events: Greenham Common Women's Peace Camp (1981–2000)

Airfield information
- Identifiers: ICAO: EGVI, WMO: 037435
- Elevation: 121 metres (397 ft) AMSL
Runways
Direction	Length and surface
11/29	3,048 metres (10,000 ft) Asphalt (built 1950s)
10/28	1,798 metres (5,899 ft) Asphalt (WW2)
14/32	1,256 metres (4,121 ft) Asphalt (WW2)
02/20	998 metres (3,274 ft) Asphalt (WW2)

Royal Air Force Greenham Common or more simply RAF Greenham Common is a former Royal Air Force station in the civil parishes of Greenham and Thatcham in the English county of Berkshire. The airfield was southeast of Newbury, about 55 miles (89 km) west of London.

Opened in 1942, it was used by the United States Air Force during the Second World War and during the Cold War, and later as a base for nuclear weapons. After the Cold War ended, it was closed in September 1992. The airfield was also known for the Greenham Common Women's Peace Camp held outside its gates in the 1980s in protest against the stationing of cruise missiles on the base. In 1997 Greenham Common was designated as public parkland.

== History ==
=== Second World War ===
The Greenham Lodge Estate, which was set in the midst on Greenham Common, was requisitioned by the Air Ministry in 1941.

The first arrival was the U.S. Army Air Forces (USAAF) 51st Troop Carrier Wing Headquarters, arriving in September 1942. The 51st TCW controlled the three troop carrier groups at RAF Keevil (62nd TCG), RAF Aldermaston (60th TCG) and RAF Ramsbury (64th TCG) as part of Twelfth Air Force. An area to the east of Bowdown House, a mansion on the northeast end of the airfield, was used as "bomb stores".

The 51st TCW HQ followed its groups to North Africa as part of Operation Torch in November 1942.

In late 1943, Greenham Common airfield was turned over to the USAAF Ninth Air Force. An American advance party soon arrived to ready the airfield for the incoming units. Greenham Common was known as USAAF Station AAF-486.

==== 354th Fighter Group ====
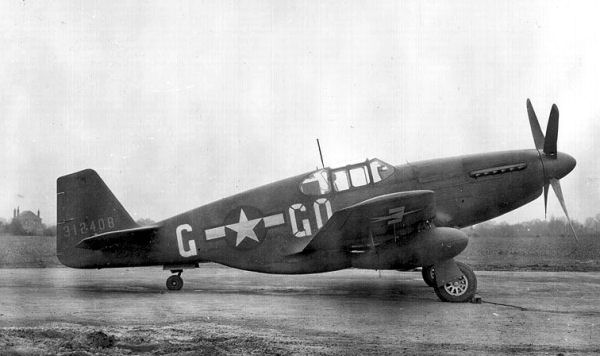
North American P-51B-1-NA Mustang, AAF Ser. No. 43-12408 of the 355th Fighter Squadron

As troop carrier groups began arriving in the UK in late 1943 and deployed in the Greenham area, Greenham Common was one of the airfields used by the Ninth Air Force for fighter groups arriving from the United States. On 4 November the 354th Fighter Group arrived from Portland Army Air Field, Oregon and they were informed they were to fly the North American P-51 Mustang. The unit transferred to RAF Lashenden in April 1944.

==== 368th Fighter Group ====
A few weeks later on 13 January 1944, the 368th Fighter Group arrived from Farmingdale, New York, flying Republic P-47 Thunderbolts. They had the following fighter squadrons and fuselage codes:

- 395th Fighter Squadron (A7)
- 396th Fighter Squadron (C2)
- 397th Fighter Squadron (D3)

The 368th was a group of Ninth Air Force's 71st Fighter Wing, IX Tactical Air Command. The 368th FG moved to RAF Chilbolton on 15 March 1944.

==== 438th Troop Carrier Group ====
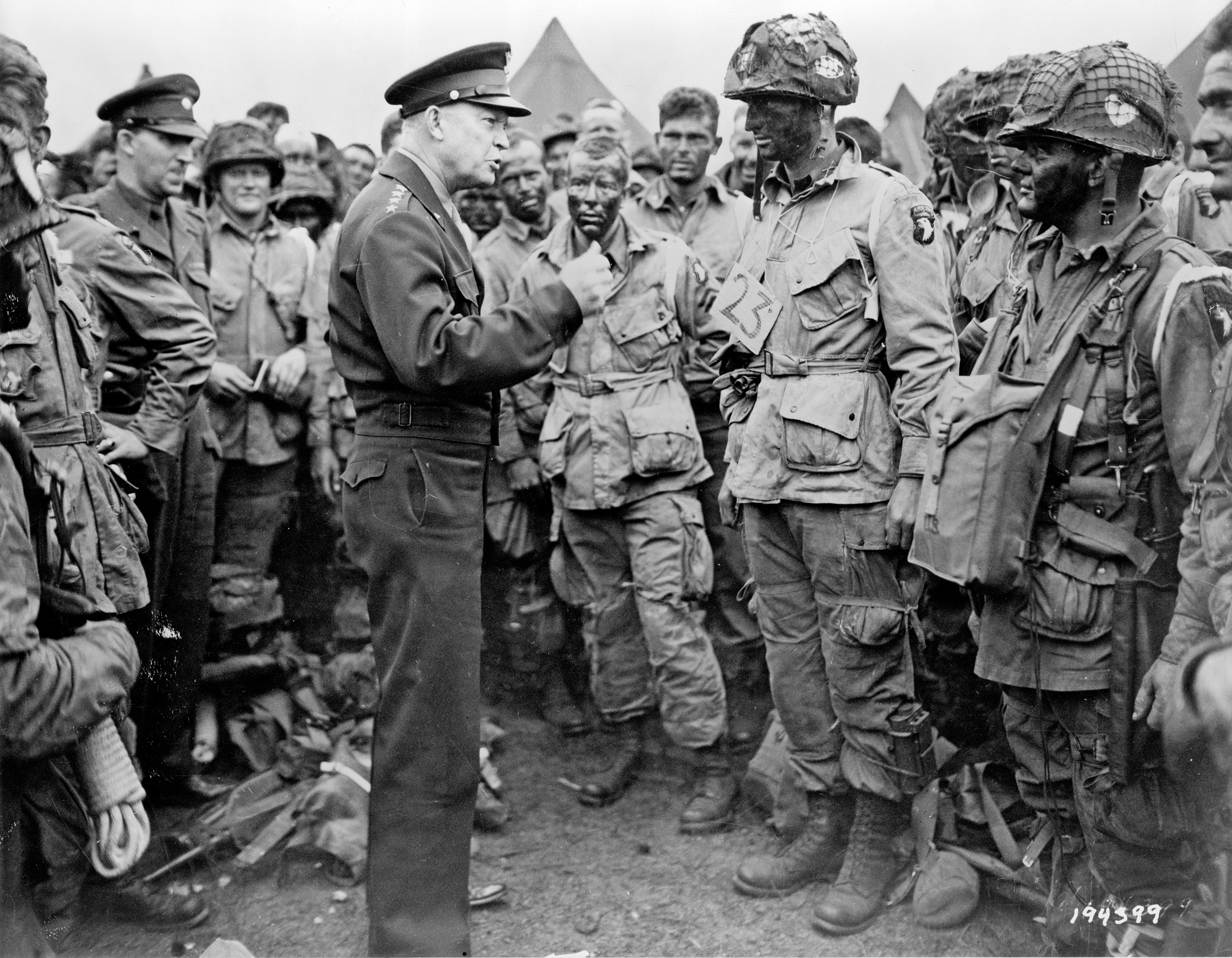
General Dwight D. Eisenhower addresses Company E, 502nd Parachute Infantry Regiment (Strike), at Greenham Common Airfield about 8:30 pm on 5 June 1944.

Literally as the 368th FG was moving out, the 438th Troop Carrier Group was flying into Greenham Common from RAF Langar. Flying Douglas C-47 Skytrains, they had the following Troop Carrier squadrons and fuselage codes:

- 87th Troop Carrier Squadron (3X)
- 88th Troop Carrier Squadron (M2)
- 89th Troop Carrier Squadron (4U)
- 90th Troop Carrier Squadron (Q7)
- 94th Troop Carrier Squadron (D8)

The 438th was a group of Ninth Air Force's 53rd Troop Carrier Wing of IX Troop Carrier Command. The unit moved to Prosnes in France in February 1945.

=== Cold War ===
==== Strategic Air Command ====
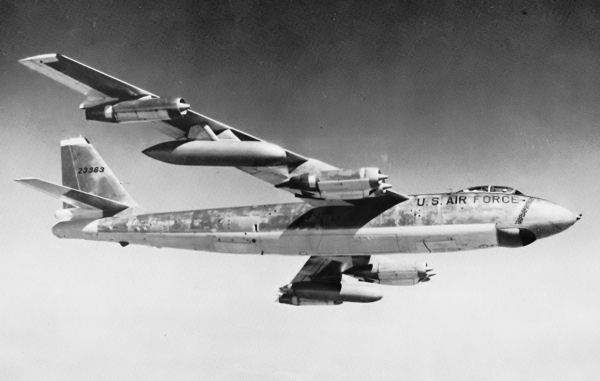
USAF Boeing B-47E-50-LM Stratojet, AF Ser. No. 52-3363, in flight.

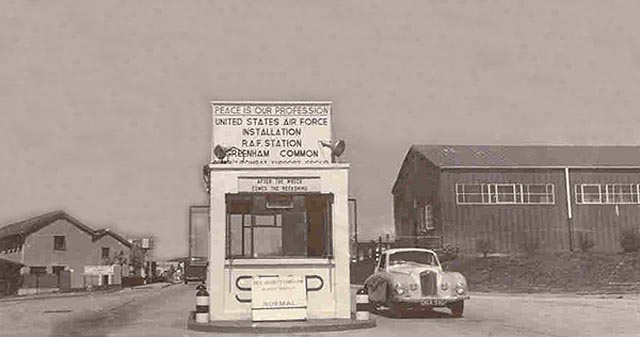
Gate to RAF Greenham Common during 1961

In the post-Second World War years, the Strategic Air Command (SAC) of the United States Air Force (USAF) was based at three major airfields in eastern England: RAF Lakenheath, RAF Mildenhall and RAF Sculthorpe. The increasing tension of the Cold War led to a re-evaluation of these deployments and a move further west, behind RAF fighter forces, to RAF Greenham Common, RAF Brize Norton, RAF Upper Heyford and RAF Fairford. The airfield came under SAC's 7th Air Division, with the 3909th Combat Support Group as its administrative unit on the base, responsible for all non-flying activities as well as maintenance and logistical support of the flying units attached to RAF Greenham Common. One of the first deployments was 310th Bombardment Wing which arrived with its Boeing B-47E Stratojets in October 1956.

===== Nuclear accident =====
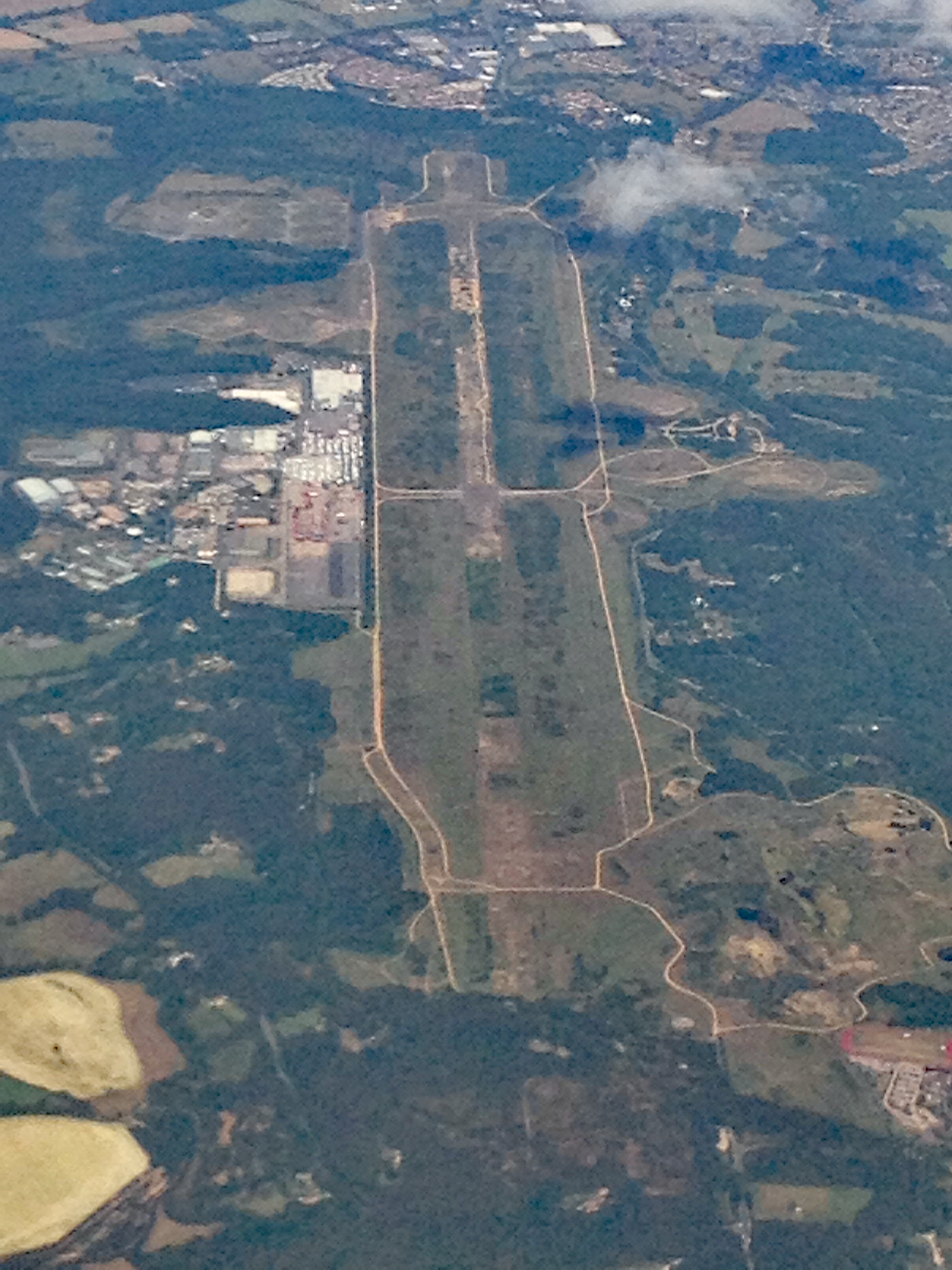
Aerial view of the former runway at RAF Greenham Common, viewed east-to-west, August 2014.

On 28 February 1958, a B-47E, of the 310th Bombardment Wing developed problems shortly after takeoff and jettisoned its two 1,700 gallon external fuel tanks. They missed their designated safe impact area, and one hit a hangar while the other struck the ground 65 feet (20 m) behind a parked plane. The parked B-47E, registration 53-6216, which was fuelled and had a pilot on board, was engulfed by flames; two ground crew were killed and two were injured.

Two scientists, F. H. Cripps and A. Stimson, who both worked for the Atomic Weapons Research Establishment at Aldermaston, stated in a secret 1961 report, released by the CND in 1996, that the fire detonated the high explosives in a nuclear weapon, that plutonium and uranium oxides were spread over a wide area (foliage up to 8 mi (13 km) away was contaminated with uranium-235) and that they had discovered high concentrations of radioactive contamination around the airfield.

However, a radiological survey commissioned in 1997 by Newbury District Council and Basingstoke and Deane Borough Council found no evidence of a nuclear accident at Greenham Common, suggesting that Cripps and Stimson's statements were false. The seven-month-long survey was carried out by the Geosciences Advisory Unit of Southampton University and combined a helicopter-mounted gamma ray detector survey with a ground-based survey. The team analysed nearly 600 samples taken from soil, lake sediment, borehole water, house dust, runway tarmac and concrete, looking for uranium and plutonium isotopes. No evidence of an accident involving nuclear weapons damage was found at the former air force base although the ground survey detected some low-level uranium contamination around the Atomic Weapons Establishment at Aldermaston thought to be derived from that facility, and the helicopter survey found some anomalies around Harwell Laboratory.

==== United States Air Forces in Europe ====
After Strategic Air Command left Greenham Common in 1964, the site was primarily used as a mail sorting and storage facility under the administrative control of 7551st Combat Support Group. Beginning in 1973 the base became the home of the International Air Tattoo, a large scale international military airshow.

==== 501st Tactical Missile Wing ====
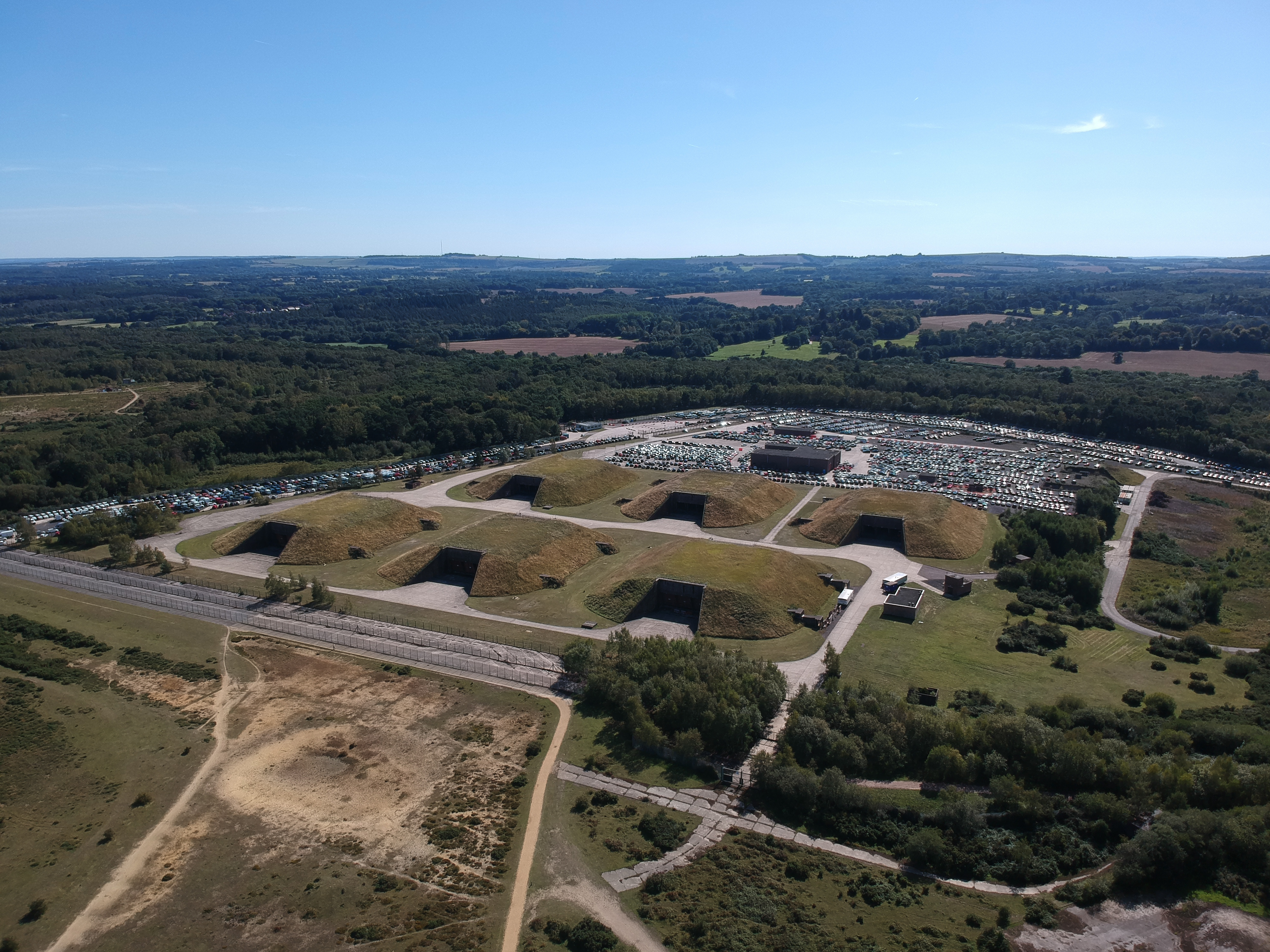
The cruise missile shelters

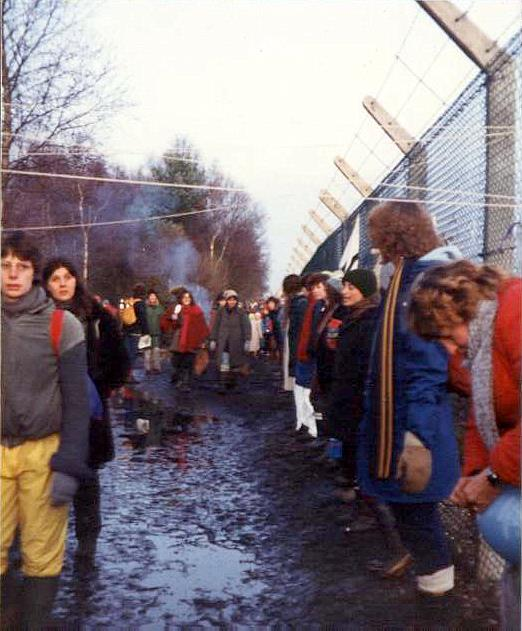
On 12 December 1982, 30,000 women held hands around the 6 miles (9.7 km) perimeter of the base, in protest against the decision to site American cruise missiles there

Following the 1979 NATO Double-Track Decision, in June 1980, RAF Greenham Common was selected as one of two British bases for the USAF's mobile nuclear armed BGM-109G Gryphon Ground Launched Cruise Missile (GLCM). This missile was derived from the sea-launched Tomahawk Land Attack Missile. Some missiles were deployed at RAF Molesworth, but the majority of GLCMs were deployed at RAF Greenham Common.

A Greenham Common Women's Peace Camp was established in protest at the deployment of cruise missiles in 1981. The protestors became known as "the Greenham women" or "peace women", and their 19-year protest drew worldwide media and public attention.

After being equipped with the new weapons, the 501st Tactical Missile Wing was activated at Greenham Common on 1 July 1982. Following the ratification of the Intermediate-Range Nuclear Forces Treaty by U.S. President Ronald Reagan and the General Secretary of the CPSU Mikhail Gorbachev in June 1988, the last GLCMs at RAF Greenham Common were removed in March 1991, and the 501st Tactical Missile Wing was deactivated in May 1991.

=== Post RAF station ===
In 1997, Greenham Common was designated as public parkland, effectively returning it to its pre-Second World War status but with restrictions. Greenham and Crookham Commons became a Site of Special Scientific Interest. The Cold War era control tower has recently been redeveloped and is now open as a visitor centre with a historical exhibition and community cafe. Cattle from local farms are permitted to graze the Common and often stray onto the adjacent Burys Bank Road.

== Greenham Common Control Tower ==
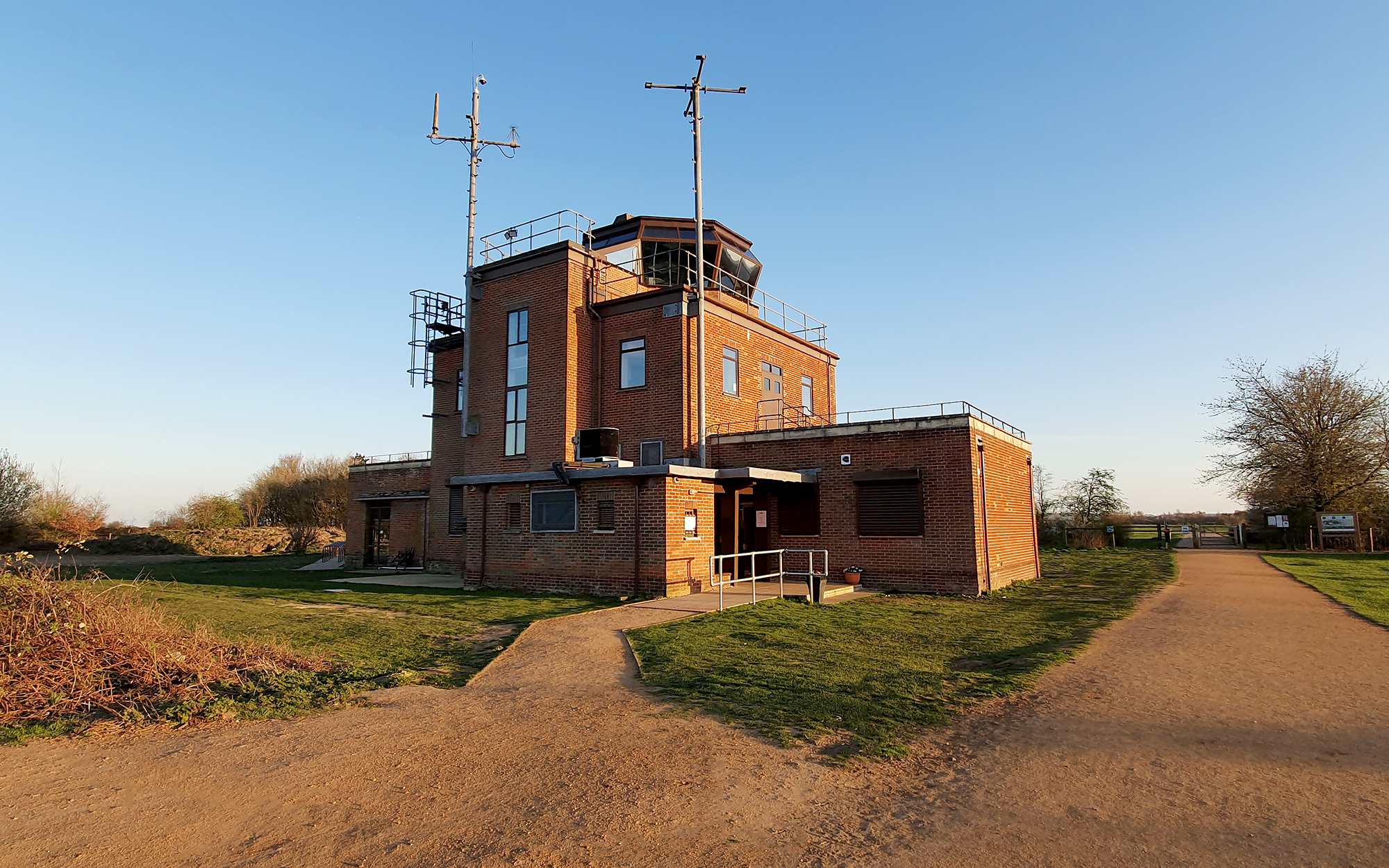
Greenham Common Control Tower in 2019, shortly after its opening to the public as a café and visitors centre

Following the closure of RAF Greenham Common in 1992, one of the few remaining buildings from the former air base was the control tower, situated on the north side of the runway. This was left derelict until Greenham Parish Council bought it in April 2014 with the intention of converting it into a café and visitors' centre. However, this was repeatedly delayed by political and construction problems, until it was eventually opened to the public in September 2018.

The control tower features three floors, with the café on the ground floor and a visitors' centre on the first floor, housing a permanent exhibition on Greenham Common's Cold War history and a temporary exhibition space. The top floor observation area offers panoramic views across the Common.

Since its opening in 2018, the control tower has hosted numerous exhibitions on the history of the common and surrounding area. This included "Both Sides of the Fence" in 2021, marking 40 years since the arrival of the Greenham peace women at the air base.

== In popular culture ==
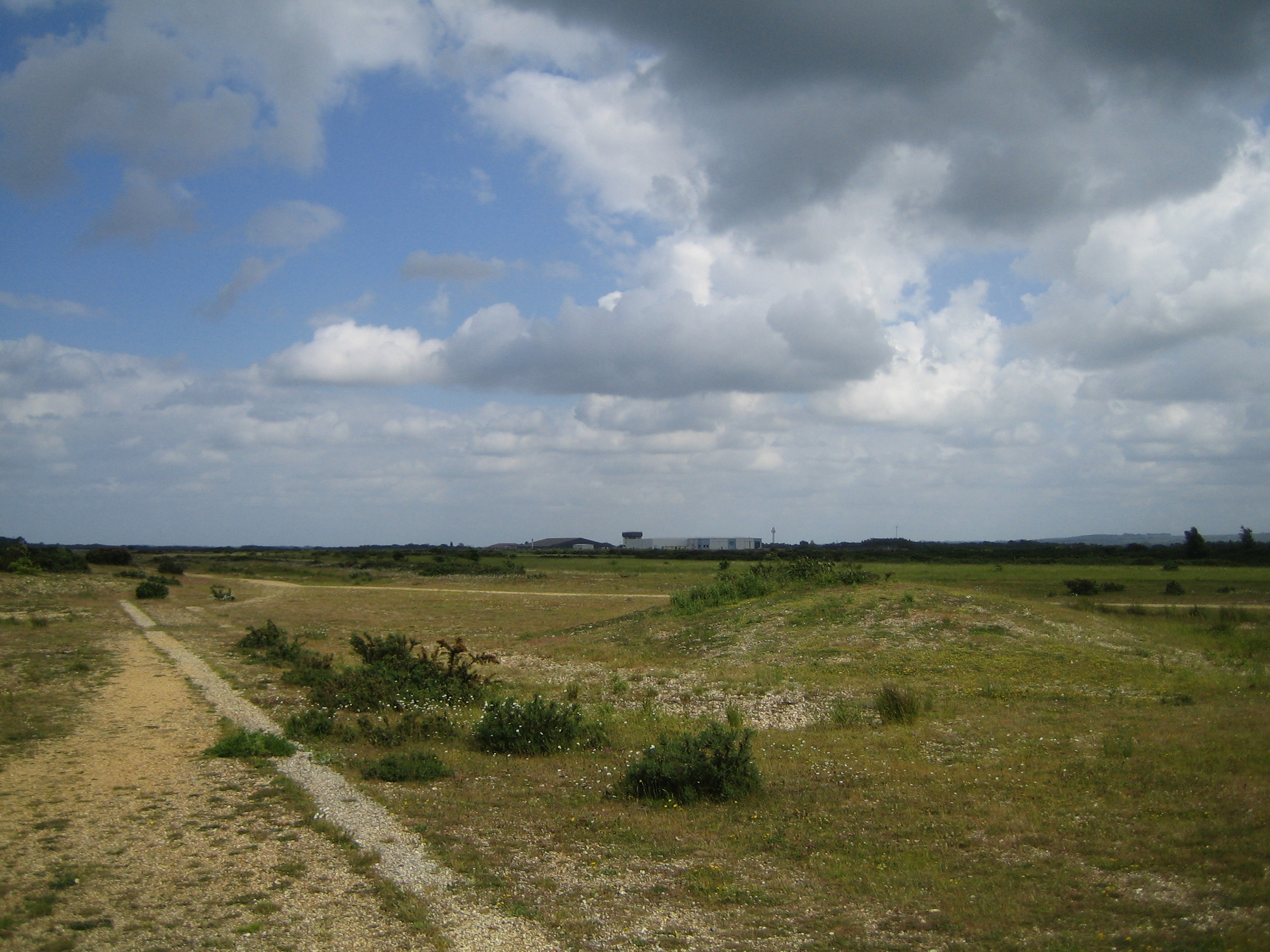
Greenham Common in 2005. The hangars can be seen in the distance.

The airfield was used in the sixth series of London's Burning where the production team built a petrol garage and diner to be used in a large incident in episode 7.

An episode of BBC's Top Gear was filmed at the abandoned airfield, with Jeremy Clarkson and James May attempting to find out if communism had produced a good car.

Beyoncé used the airfield to film scenes for her 2013 visual album.

Greenham Common airfield was used as a filming location for the 2015 film Star Wars: The Force Awakens and 2017 film Star Wars: The Last Jedi. The GAMA (GLCM Alert and Maintenance Area) was used as the location for the above ground Resistance base on the fictional planet D'Qar. In 2023, the base was once again used for filming a Star Wars location, the second series of the television programme Andor.

Greenham Common airfield was also used as a filming location for the 2019 film Fast and Furious 9.

Additionally, Greenham Common airfield was used as a filming location for the 2023 film Heart of Stone.

The airfield is currently used to host Greenham Common, Newbury parkrun, a weekly 5-kilometre running and walking event. It was originally known as Newbury parkrun, but was renamed following the establishment of a separate parkrun at Victoria Park in Newbury to avoid confusion.

== See also ==
- List of former Royal Air Force stations
- RAF Lakenheath nuclear weapons accidents

== Notes ==
=== Bibliography ===
- Birtles, Philip (2012). UK Airfields of the Cold War. Midland Publishing. ISBN 978-1-85780-346-4.
- Fletcher, Harry R. (1989) Air Force Bases Volume II, Active Air Force Bases outside the United States of America on 17 September 1982. Maxwell AFB, Alabama: Office of Air Force History. ISBN 0-912799-53-6
- Freeman, Roger A. (1994) UK Airfields of the Ninth: Then and Now 1994. After the Battle ISBN 0-900913-80-0
- Maurer, Maurer (1983). Air Force Combat Units of World War II. Maxwell AFB, Alabama: Office of Air Force History. ISBN 0-89201-092-4.
- Ravenstein, Charles A. (1984). Air Force Combat Wings Lineage and Honors Histories 1947–1977. Maxwell AFB, Alabama: Office of Air Force History. ISBN 0-912799-12-9.
- Rogers, Brian (2005). United States Air Force Unit Designations Since 1978. Hinkley, England: Midland Publications. ISBN 1-85780-197-0.
- Sayers, Jonathan (2006) In Defense of Freedom, a History of RAF Greenham Common
- Stokes, Penelope (2017). The Common Good: The story of Greenham Common ISBN 978-1-5272-0785-1
