= Newtown, Hampshire =

Village and parish in Hampshire, England

Coordinates: 51.372°N 1.316°W

Newtown
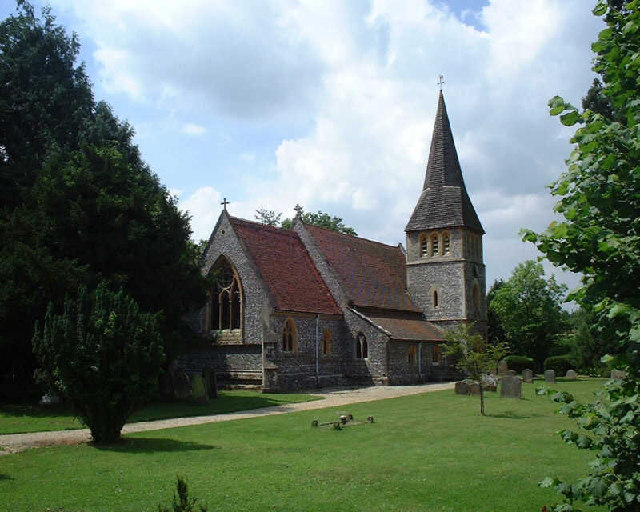
- Newtown Church

- Location within Hampshire
- Population: 382 (2011 Census)
- OS grid reference: SU477639
- District: Basingstoke and Deane
- Shire county: Hampshire
- Region: South East
- Country: England
- Sovereign state: United Kingdom
- Post town: NEWBURY
- Postcode district: RG20
- Dialling code: 01635
- Police: Hampshire and Isle of Wight
- Fire: Hampshire and Isle of Wight
- Ambulance: South Central
- UK Parliament: North West Hampshire

Newtown is a village and civil parish in the English county of Hampshire, about 1 1/2 miles (2.4 km) south of Newbury, Berkshire.

== History ==
In the early 13th century, the Bishops of Winchester created six new towns: Newtown, Overton and New Alresford in Hampshire; Hindon and Downton in Wiltshire; and Newtown on the Isle of Wight.

Newtown in Hampshire was founded in 1218 by Peter des Roches, Bishop of Winchester. The medieval borough was formed from part of the parish of Burghclere, and flourished in the 13th and 14th centuries. Adjacent Sandleford Priory, Sandleford, over the border on the other side of the River Enborne (Alder stream) in Berkshire, had been founded on an earlier establishment between 1193 and 1202. Newtown as a result was sometimes known as Novus Burgus de Clere, or Nova villa de Sandelford. In 1218, the grant of a market and a fair at Newtown was made to the Bishop of Winchester and in the bishop's account roll of 1218–19, fifty-two burgesses are listed. The burgesses occupied sixty-seven plots of land in the new borough. The Prior of Sandleford bought three plots. Also in 1218–19, a chapel was built for the local people of the new borough, and was originally known as the Chapel of Sandleford.

In 1224–25 a ditch was dug around the town at the bishop's expense and, in 1225–26, the bishop's own house was built in the borough. Dated the feast of St. Katherine, 9 Edward III, [25 November, c. 1336], a grant was made by Hugh atte Thome and Maud his wife to Sir Nicholas atte Thorne their son, chaplain, of a burgage in Newtown (Nova Villa juxta Sandelford) between the brook called 'Aleburne' on the west and the highway to Winchester on the east;

By the 16th century, the town had begun to decay, although the reason for its decline is not known, and, in 1674, only sixty-four houses remained, probably scattered throughout the parish. No traces of the medieval borough can be seen above ground today.

== Governance ==
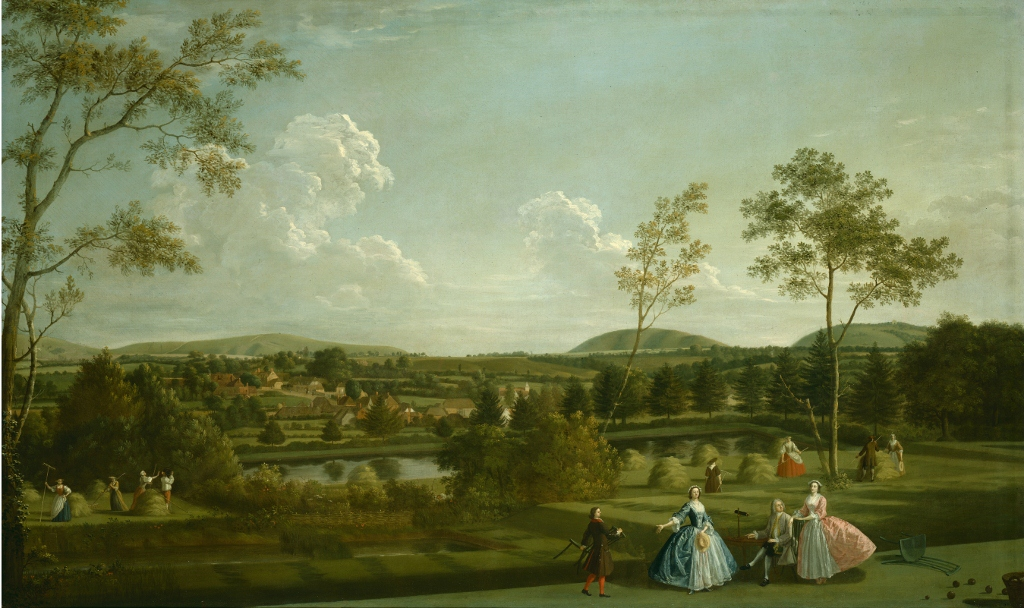
Newtown shown in the distance of a portrait of the Montagu family of Sandleford Priory by Edward Haytley, 1744

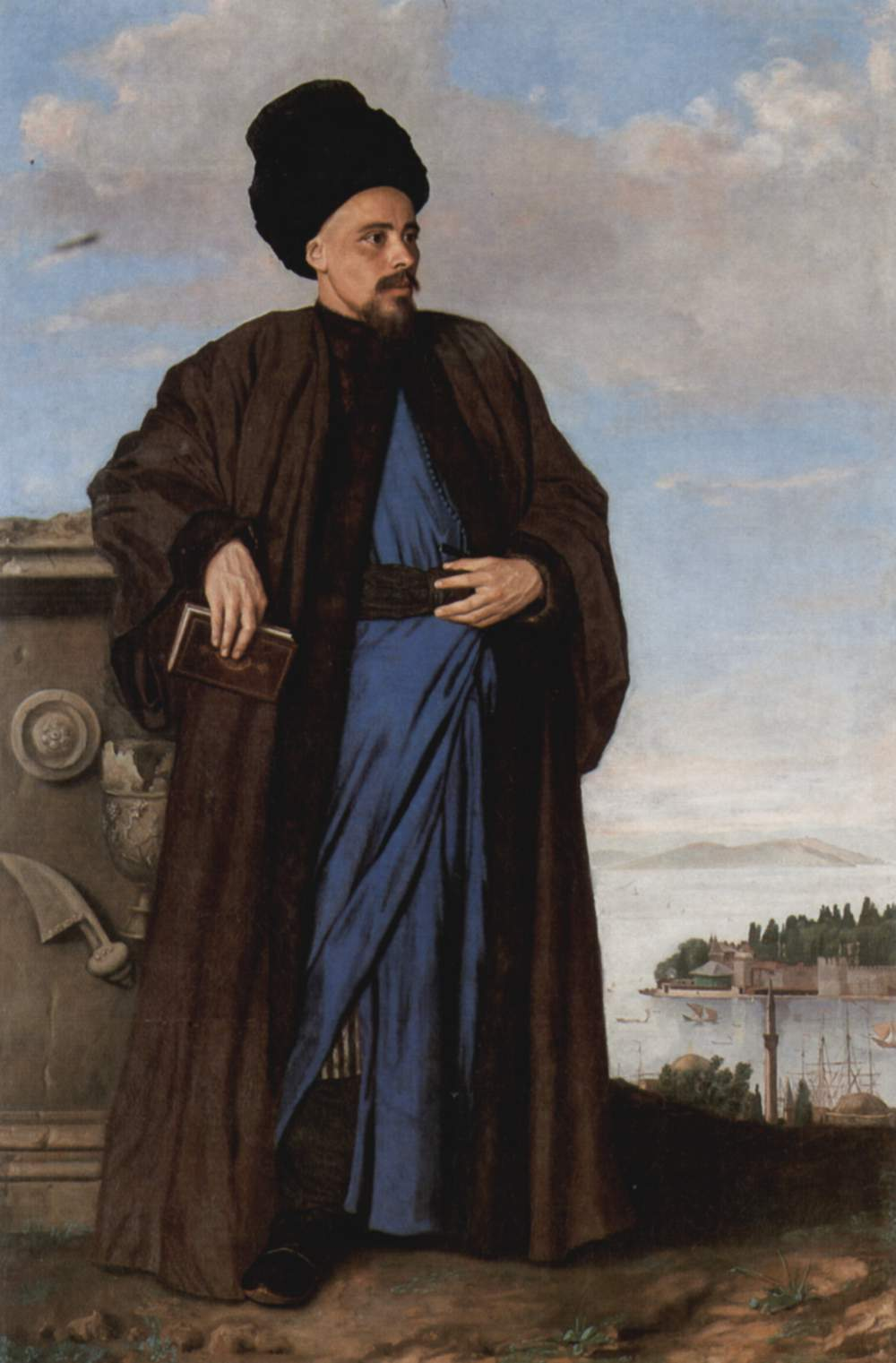
Richard Pococke, of Newtown House, Bishop of Meath, by Jean-Étienne Liotard

The village of Newtown is part of the civil parish of Newtown, and is part of the Burghclere, Highclere and St. Mary Bourne ward of Basingstoke and Deane borough council. The borough council is a Non-metropolitan district of Hampshire County Council.

== Religious sites ==
The Church of England parish church of St Mary and St John the Baptist was built in 1865 on the site of the original medieval chapel. The building was financed entirely by Edmund (1793–1873) and Elizabeth Arbuthnot (died 1866). Eliza Arbuthnot's brother William Pollet Brown Chatteris (1810–1889), JP, DL, had taken on the lease of neighbouring Sandleford in 1831 and then bought it outright in 1875. The church is filled with stained glass windows in their collective memory. Edmund Arbuthnot had bought Newtown House in 1824.

== Industry ==
Butchers, bakers, ironmongers and shoemakers were listed in the old borough records, but more recently the parish has been famed locally for making wooden rakes.

== Notable people ==
- Peter des Roches, the Bishop of Winchester who founded Newtown
- Mrs. Montagu of Sandleford; her favourite view from her priory was looking south from her terrace towards Newtown, as recorded by Edward Haytley, circa 1744, and in her letters
- Vice Admiral George Darby (c.1720 – 1790), of Newtown House; commander-in-chief of the Western squadron 1780–2; M.P. for Plymouth, 1780–1784; Lord of the Admiralty (one of the Lords Commissioners of the Admiralty) 1780 – March 1782
- Major-General Matthew Chitty Darby-Griffith (born Hampshire, 1771/72 – 1821/23), the second son of Vice Admiral George Darby by his wife, Mary, daughter of Sir William St Quintin, 4th Baronet
- Rt. Rev. Dr. Richard Pococke, of Newtown House, Bishop of Meath; a grandson of Rev. Isaac Milles, of Highclere
- Eustace Roskill, Baron Roskill, Lord of Appeal in Ordinary
- Tristan de Vere Cole, producer of TV's Z Cars, which was set in a fictional Newtown

== Literature ==
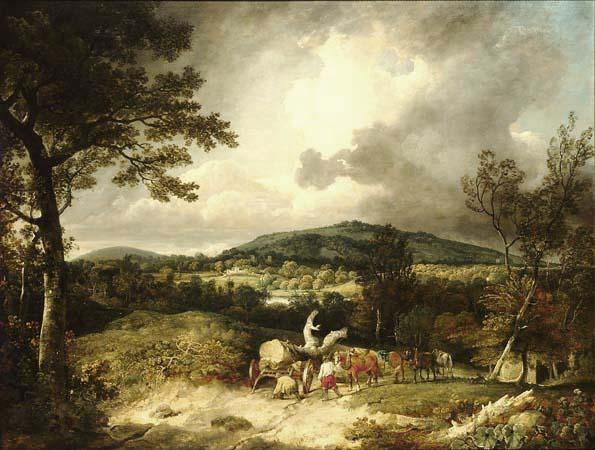
A view south from Newtown or Sandleford by George Arnald (1763–1841): wood gatherers, with Highclere Castle in the distance, 1805

Newtown churchyard and Newtown Common both feature in Richard Adams' novel, Watership Down.

== Mrs Elizabeth Montagu's 1743 description of Newtown ==
In 1743 Mrs Montagu wrote from Sandleford to her old friend the Duchess of Portland and described her new retreat:

'...I had a very pleasant journey to this place [Sandleford], where I am delighted to find everything that is capable of making retreat agreeable; the garden commands a fine prospect, the most cheerful I ever saw, and not of shirt distance which is only to gratify the pride of seeing, but such as falls within the humble reach of my eyes. We have a pretty village [Newtown] on a rising ground just before us.'

Where the cottage chimney smokes,

Fast between two oaks.

'Poverty here is clad in its decent garb of low simplicity, but her tattered robes of misery do not here show want and wretchedness; you would rather imagine pomp was neglected than sufficiency wanted.'

'A silver stream [the Alder stream, aka River Enborne] washes the foot of the village [Newtown]; health, pleasure, and refreshment are the ingredients that qualify this spring; no debauch, or intoxication, arises from its source.'

'Nature has been very indulgent to this country, and has given it enough of wood and water; the first we have here in good plenty, and a power of having more of the latter, as improvements are undertaken.'

'Here are temptations to riding and walking. I go out every evening to take a view of the country; the villages are the neatest I ever saw; every cottage is tight; has a little garden, and is sheltered by fine trees...'
