= Enborne Row =

Hamlet in Berkshire, England

Coordinates: 51°22′07″N 1°21′57″W

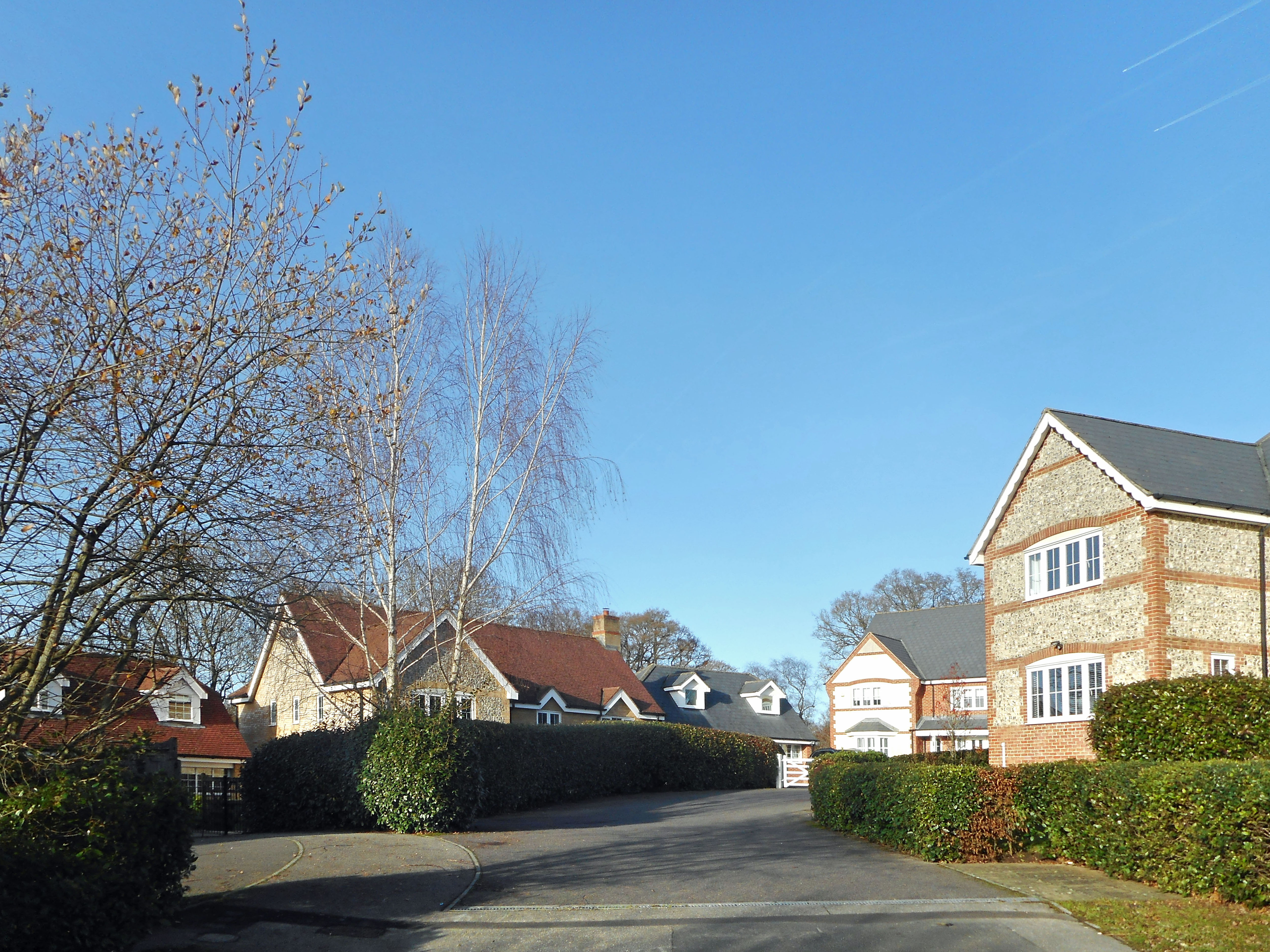
- Housing in Enborne Row

- Location within Berkshire
- OS grid reference: SU439646
- Unitary authority: West Berkshire
- Ceremonial county: Berkshire
- Region: South East
- Country: England
- Sovereign state: United Kingdom
- Post town: NEWBURY
- Postcode district: RG20
- Dialling code: 01635
- Police: Thames Valley
- Fire: Royal Berkshire
- Ambulance: South Central
- UK Parliament: Newbury

Enborne Row is a hamlet in Berkshire, England, located on the county's border with Hampshire. The hamlet is within the civil parish of Enborne. The settlement lies next to the A34 road, and is located approximately 3 miles (4.8 km) south-west of Newbury.

The name Enborne comes from Old English and means duck stream. It was also the location of Woodhay Railway Station on the DN&SR.
