= East Woodhay =

Village and parish in Hampshire, England

Coordinates: 51.351°N 1.417°W

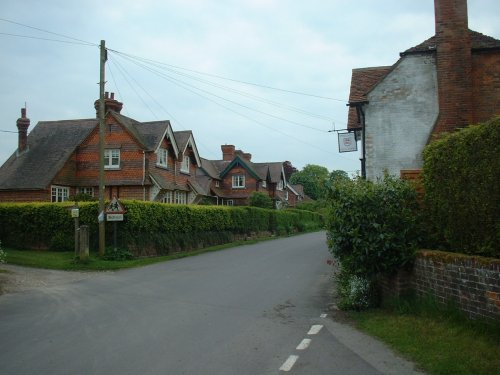
- East Woodhay

- Location within Hampshire
- Population: 2,914 (2011 Census, including Gore End)
- OS grid reference: SU407614
- Civil parish: East Woodhay
- District: Basingstoke and Deane
- Shire county: Hampshire
- Region: South East
- Country: England
- Sovereign state: United Kingdom
- Post town: NEWBURY
- Postcode district: RG20
- Dialling code: 01635
- Police: Hampshire and Isle of Wight
- Fire: Hampshire and Isle of Wight
- Ambulance: South Central
- UK Parliament: North West Hampshire
- Website: Parish Council

East Woodhay is a village and civil parish in Hampshire, England. The village is approximately 5.5 miles (9 km) south-west of Newbury in Berkshire. At the 2011 census the parish had a population of 2,914.

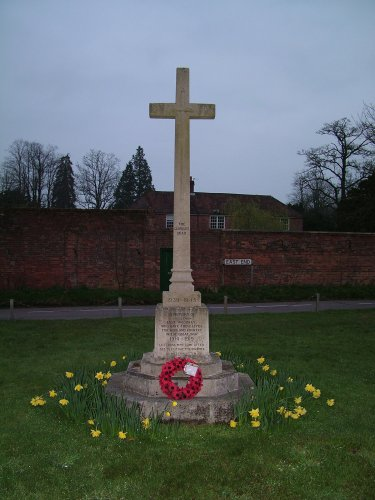
War Memorial

The parish contains a number of villages and hamlets, including Ball Hill, Heath End, Hatt Common, Woolton Hill and East End. The last two have schools: Woolton Hill Junior School, St Thomas's Church of England Infant School, and St. Martin's Church of England Primary School. The parish has a small, triangular village green which has a war memorial and was once the site of the village stocks. Woolton Hill has a village shop and post office, and "The Chase", a wooded area administered by the National Trust.

The summit of Pilot Hill, the highest point in the county of Hampshire, lies within the parish.

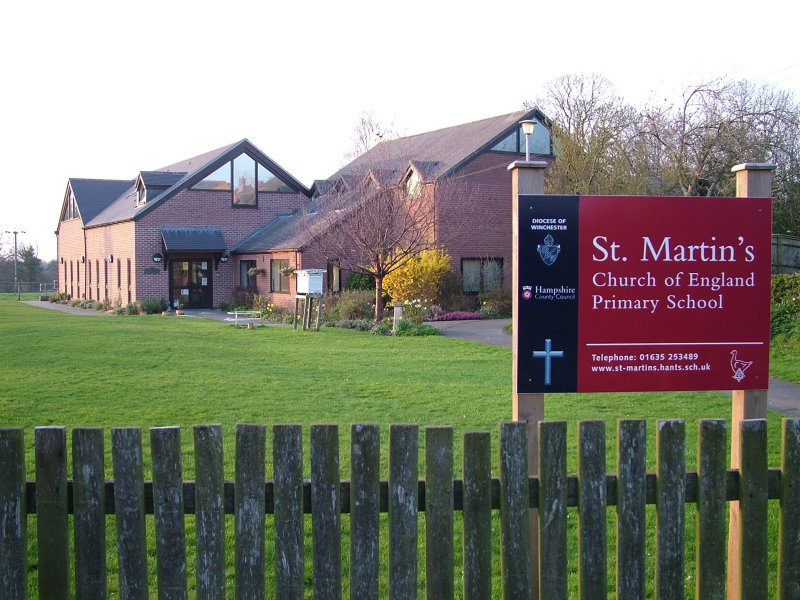
St. Martin's School, East End

== History ==
=== Name ===
The name East Woodhay has changed over the years.

- 1144: Wydenhaya
- 1150: Wideheia
- 1171: Wydenhaye
- 1351: Estwydehay

The name may possibly be from the Old English "Wudeuhege" or "Wudeugehaeg" meaning "Wood enclosure" (using artificial fences), or more likely from the earlier "widu" meaning "broad enclosure".

=== 17th century ===
Thomas Ken (1637–1711) was briefly chaplain to Princess Mary, and later to the British Fleet. In 1685, he became Bishop of Bath and Wells. He was one of several bishops imprisoned in the Tower of London for refusing to sign King James II's "Declaration of Indulgence". Earlier in his career, he was vicar of East Woodhay for a few years until 1672.

=== 1830 ===
East Woodhay as described in Rural rides (1830) by William Cobbett

"It was dark by the time that we got to a village, called EAST WOODHAY. Sunday evening is the time for courting, in the country. It not convenient to carry this on before faces, and, at farm-houses and cottages, there are no spare apartments; so that the pairs turn out, and pitch up, to carry on their negotiations, by the side of stile or a gate. The evening was auspicious; it was pretty dark, the weather mild, and Old Michaelmas (when yearly services end) was fast approaching; and, accordingly, I do not recollect ever having before seen so many negotiations going on, within so short a distance. At WEST WOODHAY my horse [had] cast a shoe, and, as the road was abominably flinty, we were compelled to go at a snail's pace; and I should have gone crazy with impatience, had it not been for these ambassadors and ambassadresses of Cupid, to every pair of whom I said something or other. I began by asking the fellow my road; and, from the tone and manner of his answer, I could tell pretty nearly what prospect he had of success, and knew what to say to draw something from him. I had some famous sport with them, saying to them more than I should have said by day-light, and a great deal less than I should have said, if my horse had been in a condition to carry me away as swiftly as ..."

=== 1870–1872 ===
East Woodhay, as described in John Goring's Imperial Gazetteer of England and Wales (1870–72)

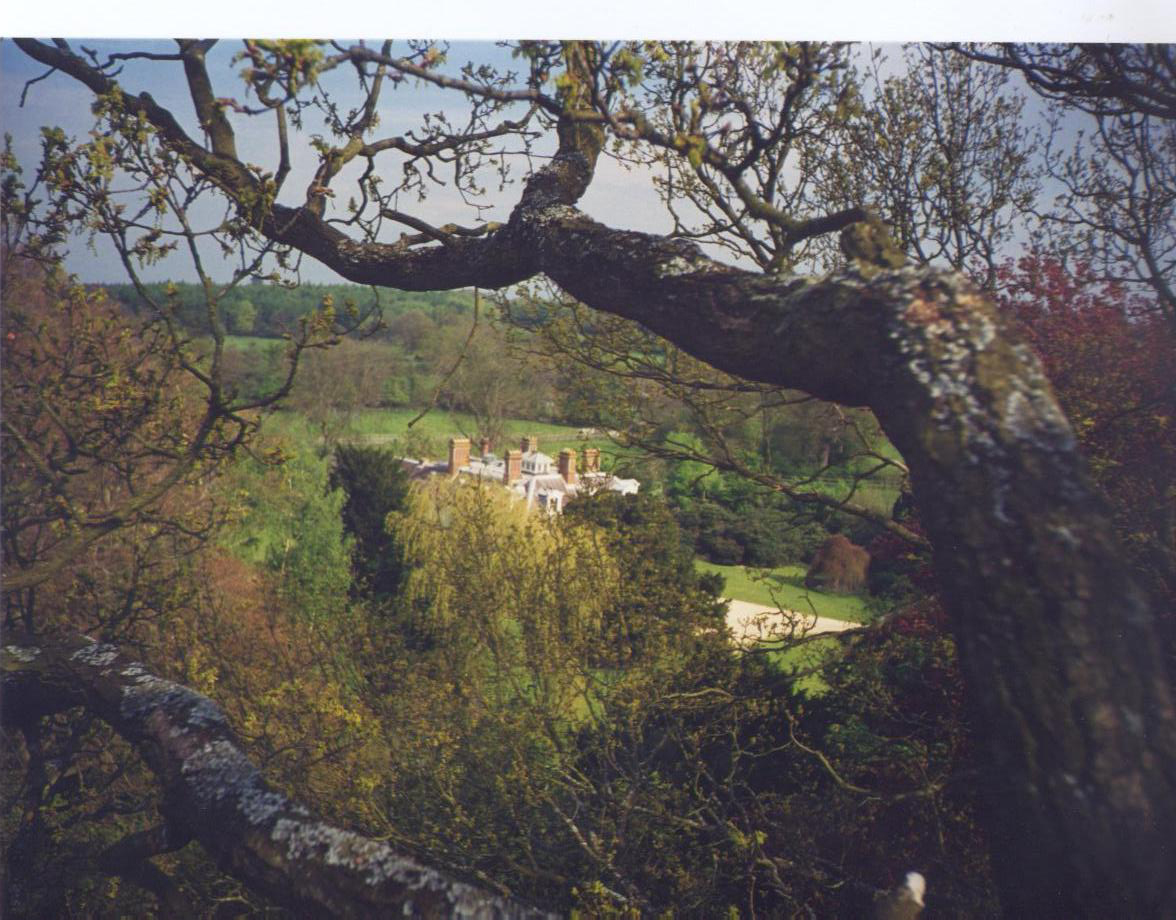
Bourne House: upgraded from a cottage in the 1850s

"WOODHAY (East), a parish, with numerous hamlets and with Woolton-Hill chapelry, in Kingsclere district, Hants; 4½ miles [7 km] SSE of Kintbury r. station, and 4½ [miles (7 km)] SW of Newbury. Post town, Newbury. Acres, 4,966 [20 km^{2}]. Real property, £6,795. Pop., 1,533. Houses, 346. The property is much subdivided. A palace of the Bishops of Winchester was here. The living is a rectory, united with Ashmansworth, in the diocese of Winchester. Value, £1,078.* Patron, the Bishop of W. The church's chancel was rebuilt in 1850. The vicarage of Woolton-Hill is a separate benefice. There are Baptist and Wesleyan chapels, national schools, and charities £16. Bishops Hooper, Ken, and Lowth were rectors."

=== 20th century ===
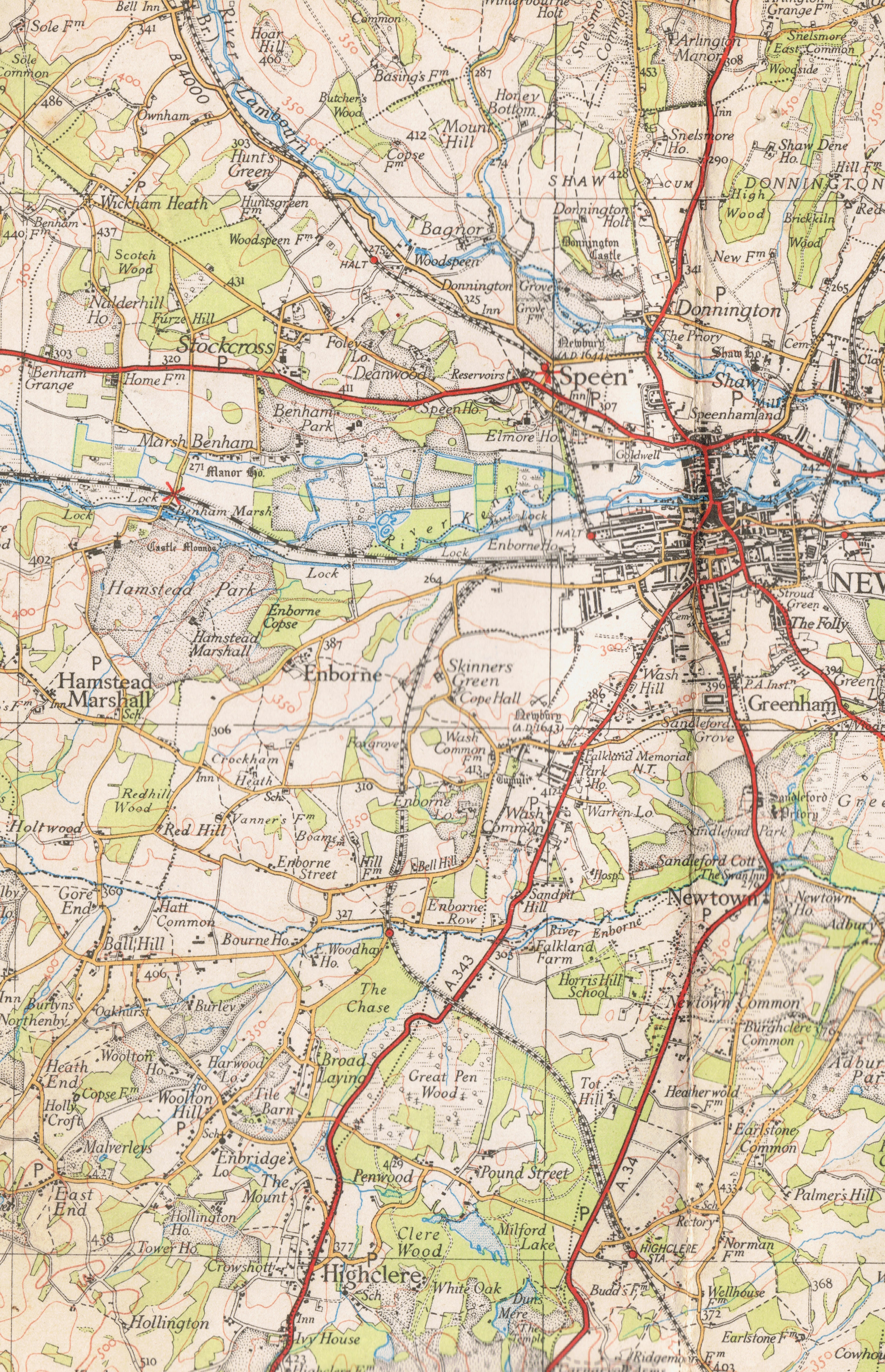
East Woodhay and Newbury, Ordnance Survey map of 1939

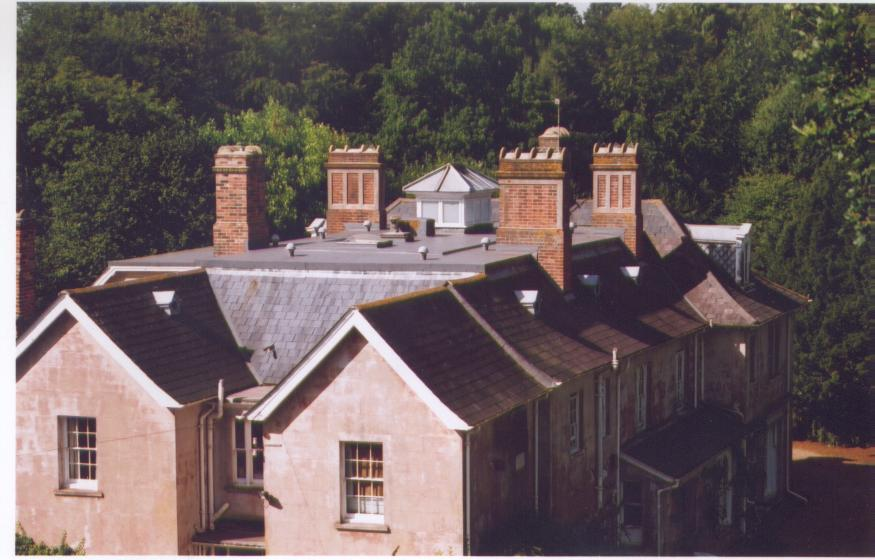
1870-1920s roof near Hatt Common

East Woodhay as mentioned in Highways and Byways in Hampshire, by D. H. Moutray Read, Macmillan & Co, London, 1908:

Afterwards the ladies met, and corresponded with every sign of mutual liking, a regards evidently not extended to Miss Pokckie; "such a low-bred, narrow-spirited woman", Dean Lyttleton wrote to Mrs Montagu, that she "would disgrace an episcopal house." The highly classical education on which her brother throve, appears to have had unhappy results for the sister!

To appreciate Highclere one should not come down by the path of the downs but alight from a railway train and drive from Woodhay Station up the gravel road, by the fine timber, and through the large village of trim villas in a station cab! Wild spaces and dreams of primitive men accord but ill with orderly parterres and velvet lawns, and in the country along the Berkshire border we find again a modern England we all know and some us do not care about, the England of "desirable residences within easy reach of the railway station", and "on gravel soil," not forgetting "with fine views"; and the sport if the "sport" of syndicates. But as the railway line is left behind the country grows wilder, and the Downs are again approached; the rough lanes twine and tumble in and over the spurs and valleys that run up the dominating heights of Walbury and Inkpen. On one such rise stands the church of East Woodhay, well above that village. The grey, ivy-covered stones in the graveyard look venerable enough, but the church, as a table on the tower announces, was rebuilt in 1823, and the only possible word in its favour is that the brick of which its partly composed gives a touch of colour among the elms of the litten, where the rooks caw evident approval of the water-wheel that protrudes itself within a few feet of the tower. But if the church belongs to the genteel age of architecture, the yew by the rectory is said to have been planted by Bishop Ken, when that old friend of Rector Isaac Mills held the living.

A good deal of "pleasant modern glass" by designer Louise Davies (1919) is found in the East Window at Saint Martin's Church.

Woodhay railway station, which closed on 7 March 1960, was built on the former Woodhay heath in the north-eastern Broad Laying, Woolton Hill corner of the parish. It also served Wash Water and Enborne over the border in Berkshire.

== Governance ==
Alongside the civil parishes of Ashmansworth, Burghclere, Highclere, Hurstbourne Priors, Litchfield and Woodcott, Newtown, and St. Mary Bourne, East Woodhay forms part of the Evingar ward of Basingstoke and Deane borough council.

== Filmography ==
A Doctor Who story called the Pyramids of Mars (featuring Tom Baker) was filmed at Stargroves, a large estate at the top of East End. Baker visited the children of St Martin's School and donated a large pyramid from the set to the school.

== Notable rectors ==
- Thomas Ken (1637–1711)
- George Hooper (1640–1727)
- Robert Lowth (1710–1787)
