= Civil parishes in Berkshire =

English local government subdivision

A map of Berkshire, showing the districts: (1) West Berkshire; (2) Reading; (3) Wokingham; (4) Bracknell Forest; (5) Windsor and Maidenhead; and (6) Slough

A civil parish is a country subdivision, forming the lowest unit of local government in England. There are 104 civil parishes in the ceremonial county of Berkshire, most of the county being parished; Reading is completely unparished; Bracknell Forest, West Berkshire and Wokingham are entirely parished. At the 2001 census, there were 483,882 people living in the 104 parishes, accounting for 60.5 per cent of the county's population.

== History ==
Parishes arose from Church of England divisions, and were originally purely ecclesiastical divisions. Over time they acquired civil administration powers.

The Highways Act 1555 made parishes responsible for the upkeep of roads. Every adult inhabitant of the parish was obliged to work four days a year on the roads, providing their own tools, carts and horses; the work was overseen by an unpaid local appointee, the Surveyor of Highways.

The poor were looked after by the monasteries, until their dissolution. In 1572, magistrates were given power to 'survey the poor' and impose taxes for their relief. This system was made more formal by the Poor Law Act 1601, which made parishes responsible for administering the Poor Law; overseers were appointed to charge a rate to support the poor of the parish. The 19th century saw an increase in the responsibility of parishes, although the Poor Law powers were transferred to Poor Law Unions. The Public Health Act 1872 grouped parishes into Rural Sanitary Districts, based on the Poor Law Unions; these subsequently formed the basis for Rural Districts.

Parishes were run by vestries, meeting annually to appoint officials, and were generally identical to ecclesiastical parishes, although some townships in large parishes administered the Poor Law themselves; under the Divided Parishes and Poor Law Amendment Act 1882, all extra-parochial areas and townships that levied a separate rate became independent civil parishes.

Civil parishes in their modern sense date from the Local Government Act 1894, which abolished vestries; established elected parish councils in all rural parishes with more than 300 electors; grouped rural parishes into Rural Districts; and aligned parish boundaries with county and borough boundaries. Urban civil parishes continued to exist, and were generally coterminous with the Urban District, Municipal Borough or County Borough in which they were situated; many large towns contained a number of parishes, and these were usually merged into one. Parish councils were not formed in urban areas, and the only function of the parish was to elect guardians to Poor Law Unions; with the abolition of the Poor Law system in 1930 the parishes had only a nominal existence.

The Local Government Act 1972 retained civil parishes in rural areas, and many former Urban Districts and Municipal Boroughs that were being abolished, were replaced by new successor parishes; urban areas that were considered too large to be single parishes became unparished areas.

== The current position ==
Recent governments have encouraged the formation of town and parish councils in unparished areas, and the Local Government and Rating Act 1997 gave local residents the right to demand the creation of a new civil parish.

A parish council can become a town council unilaterally, simply by resolution; and a civil parish can also gain city status, but only if that is granted by the Crown. The chairman of a town or city council is called a mayor. The Local Government and Public Involvement in Health Act 2007 introduced alternative names: a parish council can now choose to be called a community; village; or neighbourhood council.

Civil parishes with town status

== List of civil parishes and unparished areas ==
Image	Name	Status	Population (2001 census)	District	Former local authority	Refs
	Binfield	Civil parish	7,475	Bracknell Forest	Easthampstead; Rural District	
	Bracknell	Town	50,131	Bracknell Forest	Easthampstead; Rural District	
	Crowthorne	Civil parish	6,711	Bracknell Forest	Easthampstead; Rural District	
	Sandhurst	Town	20,803	Bracknell Forest	Easthampstead; Rural District	
	Warfield	Civil parish	9,226	Bracknell Forest	Easthampstead; Rural District	
	Winkfield	Civil parish	15,271	Bracknell Forest	Easthampstead; Rural District	
	Reading	Unparished area	143,096	Reading	Reading County Borough	
	Britwell	Civil parish	5,989	Slough	Eton; Rural District	
	Colnbrook with Poyle	Civil parish	5,408	Slough	Eton; Rural District	
	Slough	Unparished area	103,428	Slough	Slough Municipal Borough	
	Wexham Court	Civil parish	4,242	Slough	Eton; Rural District	
	Aldermaston	Civil parish	927	West Berkshire	Bradfield; Rural District	
	Aldworth	Civil parish	308	West Berkshire	Wantage; Rural District	
	Ashampstead	Civil parish	398	West Berkshire	Bradfield; Rural District	
	Basildon	Civil parish	1,559	West Berkshire	Bradfield; Rural District	
	Beech Hill	Civil parish	311	West Berkshire	Bradfield; Rural District	
	Beedon	Civil parish	393	West Berkshire	Wantage; Rural District	
	Beenham	Civil parish	1,175	West Berkshire	Bradfield; Rural District	
	Boxford	Civil parish	466	West Berkshire	Newbury; Rural District	
	Bradfield	Civil parish	2,172	West Berkshire	Bradfield; Rural District	
	Brightwalton	Civil parish	322	West Berkshire	Wantage; Rural District	
	Brimpton	Civil parish	613	West Berkshire	Newbury; Rural District	
	Bucklebury	Civil parish	2,066	West Berkshire	Bradfield; Rural District	
	Burghfield	Civil parish	5,894	West Berkshire	Bradfield; Rural District	
	Catmore	Civil parish	28	West Berkshire	Wantage; Rural District	
	Chaddleworth	Civil parish	482	West Berkshire	Wantage; Rural District	
	Chieveley	Civil parish	2,710	West Berkshire	Newbury; Rural District	
	Cold Ash	Civil parish	3,623	West Berkshire	Newbury; Rural District	
	Combe	Civil parish	38	West Berkshire	Hungerford; Rural District	
	Compton	Civil parish	1,521	West Berkshire	Wantage; Rural District	
	East Garston	Civil parish	532	West Berkshire	Hungerford; Rural District	
	East Ilsley	Civil parish	519	West Berkshire	Wantage; Rural District	
	Enborne	Civil parish	492	West Berkshire	Newbury; Rural District	
	Englefield	Civil parish	303	West Berkshire	Bradfield; Rural District	
	Farnborough	Civil parish	100	West Berkshire	Wantage; Rural District	
	Fawley	Civil parish	172	West Berkshire	Wantage; Rural District	
	Frilsham	Civil parish	321	West Berkshire	Bradfield; Rural District	
	Great Shefford	Civil parish	896	West Berkshire	Hungerford; Rural District	
	Greenham	Civil parish	2,712	West Berkshire	Newbury; Rural District	
	Hampstead Marshall	Civil parish	276	West Berkshire	Newbury; Rural District	
	Hampstead Norreys	Civil parish	748	West Berkshire	Wantage; Rural District	
	Hermitage	Civil parish	1,154	West Berkshire	Newbury; Rural District	
	Holybrook	Civil parish	7,162	West Berkshire	Bradfield; Rural District	
	Hungerford	Town	5,559	West Berkshire	Hungerford; Rural District	
	Inkpen	Civil parish	877	West Berkshire	Hungerford; Rural District	
	Kintbury	Civil parish	2,593	West Berkshire	Hungerford; Rural District	
	Lambourn	Civil parish	4,017	West Berkshire	Hungerford; Rural District	
	Leckhampstead	Civil parish	315	West Berkshire	Newbury; Rural District	
	Midgham	Civil parish	282	West Berkshire	Newbury; Rural District	
	Newbury	Town	28,339	West Berkshire	Newbury Municipal Borough	
	Padworth	Civil parish	548	West Berkshire	Bradfield; Rural District	
	Pangbourne	Civil parish	2,981	West Berkshire	Bradfield; Rural District	
	Peasemore	Civil parish	297	West Berkshire	Wantage; Rural District	
	Purley on Thames	Civil parish	4,232	West Berkshire	Bradfield; Rural District	
	Shaw cum Donnington	Civil parish	1,680	West Berkshire	Newbury; Rural District	
	Speen	Civil parish	2,634	West Berkshire	Newbury; Rural District	
	Stanford Dingley	Civil parish	209	West Berkshire	Bradfield; Rural District	
	Stratfield Mortimer	Civil parish	3,584	West Berkshire	Bradfield; Rural District	
	Streatley	Civil parish	974	West Berkshire	Bradfield; Rural District	
	Sulham	Civil parish	80	West Berkshire	Bradfield; Rural District	
	Sulhamstead	Civil parish	1,248	West Berkshire	Bradfield; Rural District	
	Thatcham	Town	22,824	West Berkshire	Newbury; Rural District	
	Theale	Civil parish	2,771	West Berkshire	Bradfield; Rural District	
	Tidmarsh	Civil parish	391	West Berkshire	Bradfield; Rural District	
	Tilehurst	Civil parish	14,683	West Berkshire	Bradfield; Rural District	
	Ufton Nervet	Civil parish	321	West Berkshire	Bradfield; Rural District	
	Wasing	Civil parish	55	West Berkshire	Newbury; Rural District	
	Welford	Civil parish	522	West Berkshire	Newbury; Rural District	
	West Ilsley	Civil parish	340	West Berkshire	Wantage; Rural District	
	West Woodhay	Civil parish	100	West Berkshire	Hungerford; Rural District	
	Winterbourne	Civil parish	206	West Berkshire	Newbury; Rural District	
	Wokefield	Civil parish	325	West Berkshire	Bradfield; Rural District	
	Woolhampton	Civil parish	725	West Berkshire	Newbury; Rural District	
	Yattendon	Civil parish	378	West Berkshire	Bradfield; Rural District	
	Bisham	Civil parish	1,149	Windsor and Maidenhead	Cookham; Rural District	
	Bray	Civil parish	8,425	Windsor and Maidenhead	Cookham; Rural District	
	Cookham	Civil parish	5,519	Windsor and Maidenhead	Cookham; Rural District	
	Cox Green	Civil parish	7,203	Windsor and Maidenhead	Maidenhead Municipal Borough	
	Datchet	Civil parish	4,646	Windsor and Maidenhead	Eton; Rural District	
	Eton	Town	4,980	Windsor and Maidenhead	Eton Urban District	
	Horton	Civil parish	983	Windsor and Maidenhead	Eton; Rural District	
	Hurley	Civil parish	1,854	Windsor and Maidenhead	Cookham; Rural District	
	Maidenhead	Unparished area	42,827	Windsor and Maidenhead	Maidenhead Municipal Borough	
	New Windsor	Unparished area	26,885	Windsor and Maidenhead	New Windsor Municipal Borough	
	Old Windsor	Civil parish	4,775	Windsor and Maidenhead	Windsor; Rural District	
	Shottesbrooke	Civil parish	154	Windsor and Maidenhead	Cookham; Rural District	
	Sunningdale	Civil parish	4,875	Windsor and Maidenhead	Windsor; Rural District	
	Sunninghill and Ascot	Civil parish	11,603	Windsor and Maidenhead	Windsor; Rural District	
	Waltham St Lawrence	Civil parish	1,232	Windsor and Maidenhead	Cookham; Rural District	
	White Waltham	Civil parish	2,875	Windsor and Maidenhead	Cookham; Rural District	
	Wraysbury	Civil parish	3,641	Windsor and Maidenhead	Eton; Rural District	
	Arborfield and Newland	Civil parish	2,228	Wokingham	Wokingham; Rural District	
	Barkham	Civil parish	3,511	Wokingham	Wokingham; Rural District	
	Charvil	Civil parish	2,990	Wokingham	Wokingham; Rural District	
	Earley	Town	32,036	Wokingham	Wokingham; Rural District	
	Finchampstead	Civil parish	12,334	Wokingham	Wokingham; Rural District	
	Remenham	Civil parish	547	Wokingham	Wokingham; Rural District	
	Ruscombe	Civil parish	1,027	Wokingham	Wokingham; Rural District	
	Shinfield	Civil parish	8,136	Wokingham	Wokingham; Rural District	
	Sonning	Civil parish	1,445	Wokingham	Wokingham; Rural District	
	St Nicholas Hurst	Civil parish	2,008	Wokingham	Wokingham; Rural District	
	Swallowfield	Civil parish	1,961	Wokingham	Wokingham; Rural District	
	Twyford	Civil parish	6,216	Wokingham	Wokingham; Rural District	
	Wargrave	Civil parish	3,910	Wokingham	Wokingham; Rural District	
	Winnersh	Civil parish	7,939	Wokingham	Wokingham; Rural District	
	Wokingham	Town	30,403	Wokingham	Wokingham Municipal Borough	
	Wokingham Without	Civil parish	7,099	Wokingham	Wokingham; Rural District	
	Woodley	Town	26,439	Wokingham	Wokingham; Rural District	

== See also ==
- List of civil parishes in England
