= Stanmore, Berkshire =

Coordinates: 51°30′29″N 1°19′01″W

Stanmore
- Hamlet
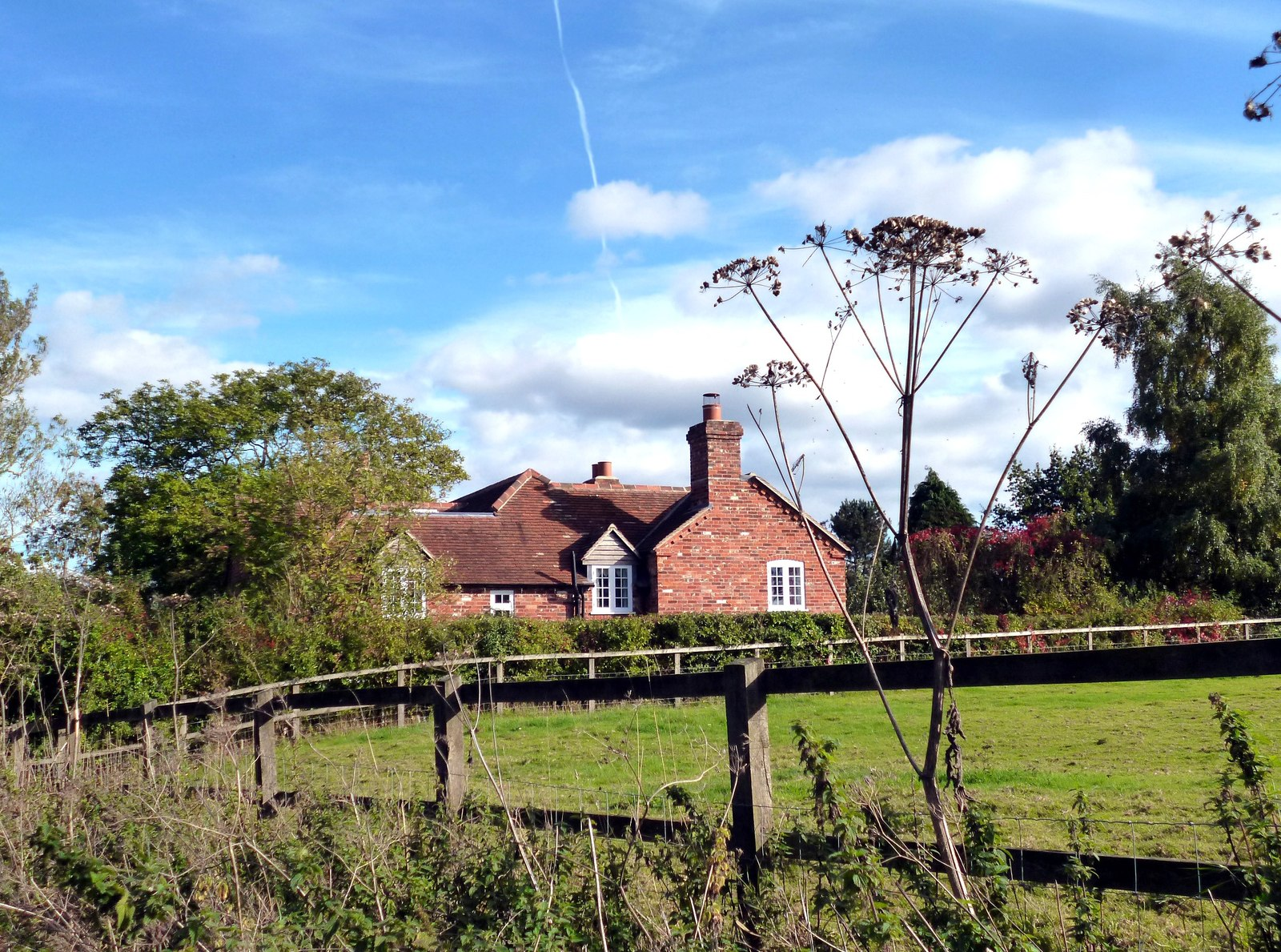
- House in Stanmore

- Location within Berkshire
- Civil parish: Beedon
- Unitary authority: West Berkshire
- Ceremonial county: Berkshire
- Region: South East
- Country: England
- Sovereign state: United Kingdom
- Post town: NEWBURY
- Postcode district: RG20
- Dialling code: 01635
- Police: Thames Valley
- Fire: Royal Berkshire
- Ambulance: South Central
- UK Parliament: Newbury

Stanmore is a hamlet in Berkshire, England. In the 2011 Census it was included in the civil parish of Beedon. It is situated west of the A34, 7 miles (11 kilometres) north of Newbury. Abingdon is 13 miles (21 kilometres) to the north and nearby villages are Beedon, East Ilsley, and Peasemore

== Listed buildings ==
South Stanmore Farm is a Grade II listed building. The farm's stable block and barn are also listed Grade II, as is the barn at North Stanmore Farm.

South-west of the settlement is a bowl barrow on Barrow Hill, excavated in the early 19th century.

== See also ==
- List of civil parishes in Berkshire
