= Stanmore (disambiguation) =

Stanmore is a town in the London Borough of Harrow.

Stanmore may also refer to:

- Stanmore (ward), ward in Harrow, London
- Stanmore, Berkshire, a hamlet in England
- Stanmore, Winchester, a suburb of Winchester, Hampshire
- Stanmore, New South Wales
- Stanmore, Queensland
- Stanmore (New Zealand electorate)
- Little Stanmore
- Stanmore tube station, a London Underground station and northern terminus for the Jubilee line

People with the surname Stanmore:

- Charles Stanmore, Australian fencer
- Frank Stanmore (disambiguation), multiple people
- Isaac Stanmore, English actor

== See also ==
- Stanmer
- Stainmore
