= Wantage Rural District =

Former local government area in the UK

Coordinates: 51.62°N 1.44°W

Map of boundary as of 1971

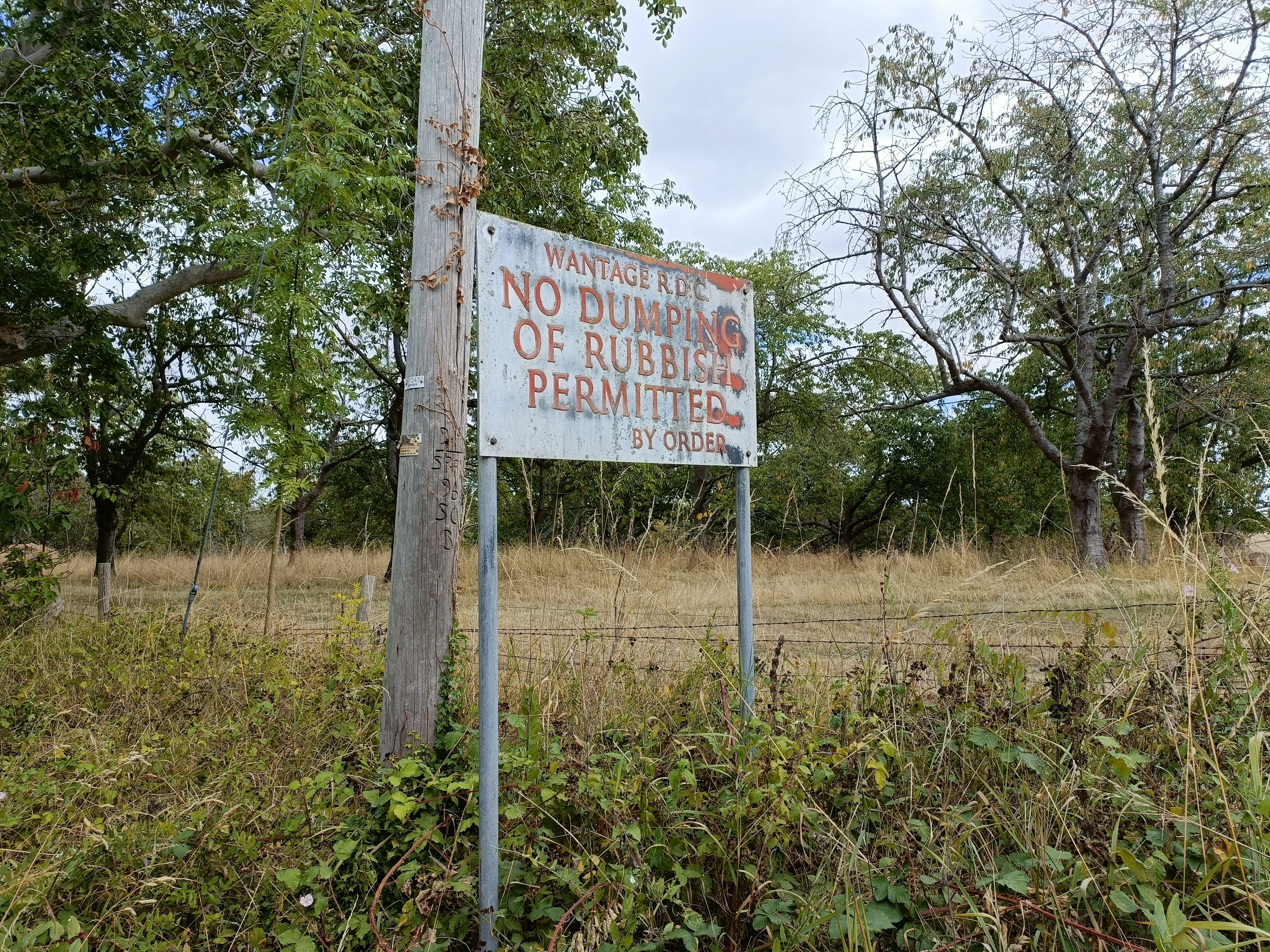
A sign erected in Harwell, Oxfordshire by Wantage Rural District Council instructing no rubbish to be dumped. Possibly dating from the early 1970s

Wantage was a rural district of Berkshire, England from 1894 to 1974.

It was created in 1894 as a successor to the Wantage rural sanitary district. It was named after Wantage, which formed a separate urban district entirely surrounded by the rural district. It had its headquarters in Belmont, Wantage.

The district was abolished in 1974 (as were all other rural districts, under the Local Government Act 1972). Its area was split between the Vale of White Horse district in Oxfordshire, and the Newbury district of Berkshire.

== Civil parishes ==
The district contained the following civil parishes during its existence:

- Aldworth
- Ardington
- Beedon
- Blewbury
- Brightwalton
- Catmore
- Chaddleworth
- Childrey
- Chilton
- Compton
- Denchworth
- East Challow
- East Hanney
- East Hendred
- East Ilsley
- Farnborough
- Fawley
- Goosey
- Grove
- Hampstead Norreys
- Harwell
- Hermitage
- Letcombe Bassett
- Letcombe Regis
- Lockinge
- Peasemore
- Sparsholt
- Upton
- West Challow
- West Hanney
- West Ilsley
