= World's End, Berkshire =

Hamlet in Berkshire, England

Coordinates: 51.486°N 1.300°W

World's End
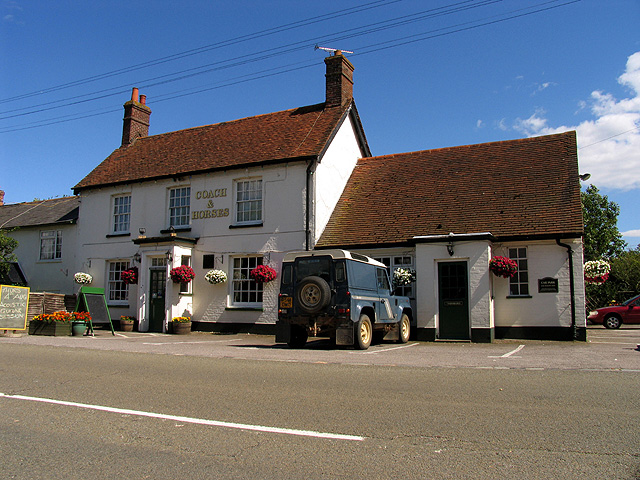
- The "Coach and Horses" pub, World's End, Berkshire.

- Location within Berkshire
- OS grid reference: SU487766
- Civil parish: Beedon
- Unitary authority: West Berkshire
- Ceremonial county: Berkshire
- Region: South East
- Country: England
- Sovereign state: United Kingdom
- Post town: Newbury
- Postcode district: RG20
- Dialling code: 01635
- Police: Thames Valley
- Fire: Royal Berkshire
- Ambulance: South Central
- UK Parliament: Reading West and Mid Berkshire

World's End is a hamlet in Berkshire, England. It is in the district of West Berkshire, near the A34 north of Newbury. To the north is the village of Beedon (where, according to the Grid Ref the 2011 Census population was included); to the south lie Downend and Chieveley. World's End is in the parish of Beedon.
