= Bradfield Rural District =

Former local government area in the UK

Coordinates: 51.45°N 1.14°W

Map of boundary as of 1971

Bradfield was a rural district in Berkshire, England, from 1894 to 1974. It consisted of the eastern part of the modern West Berkshire district, and bordered the County Borough of Reading, Newbury Rural District, Wantage Rural District and Wallingford Rural District in Berkshire, as well as Oxfordshire.

== History ==
It was created under the Local Government Act 1894 from the Bradfield rural sanitary district, except the three parishes in Oxfordshire which formed the Goring Rural District.

In 1974 Bradfield Rural District merged with other districts to form a new Newbury district of Berkshire under the Local Government Act 1972. Since 1998 this has been the West Berkshire unitary authority.

== Administrative Divisions ==
The district contained the following civil parishes during its existence:

- Aldermaston
- Ashampstead
- Basildon
- Beenham
- Bradfield
- Bucklebury
- Burghfield
- Englefield
- Frilsham
- Holybrook
- Padworth
- Pangbourne
- Purley on Thames
- Stanford Dingley
- Streatley
- Sulham
- Sulhamstead
- Theale
- Tidmarsh
- Tilehurst
- Ufton Nervet
- Wokefield
- Yattendon
