= Hungerford Town Hall =

Municipal building in Hungerford, Berkshire, England

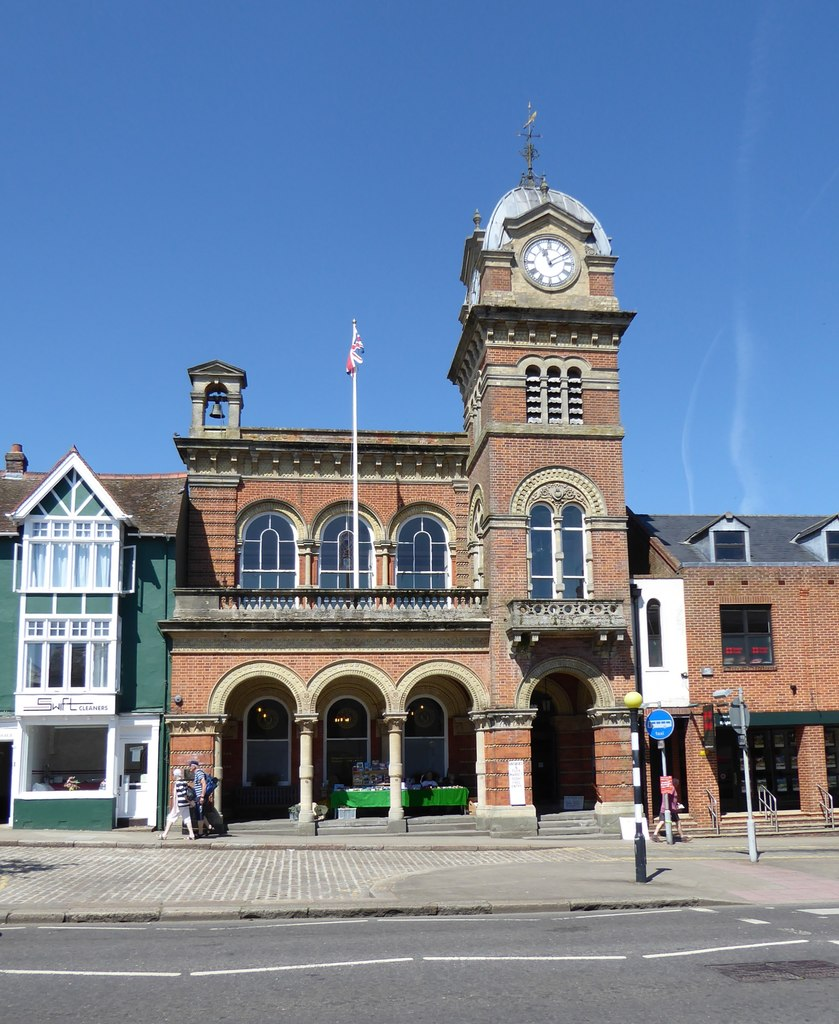
- Hungerford Town Hall

- Shown in Berkshire
- 51.4148°N 1.5160°W
- Location: High Street, Hungerford

History
- Built: 1871

Site notes
- Architect: John Money
- Architectural style: Italianate style

Listed Building – Grade II
- Official name: Town Hall
- Designated: 8 June 1984
- Reference no.: 1210595

Hungerford Town Hall is a municipal building in the High Street, Hungerford, Berkshire, England. The town hall, which is the meeting place of Hungerford Town Council, is a Grade II listed building.

== History ==
The first town hall in Hungerford, known at the time as the "Courte House", was a medieval structure which was probably arcaded on the ground floor with an assembly room on the first floor: located in the middle of the High Street, it was completed in the mid-13th century. When this building became dilapidated, it was replaced by the second town hall which was designed in the Elizabethan style and completed in 1573. After a while this building also deteriorated and it was replaced by a Georgian style structure with an octagonal cupola in 1786. In 1830, during the Swing Riots, William Oakley harangued the magistrates in this town hall.

In the 1860s civic leaders decided to procure a fourth structure: the site selected this time, on the west site of the High Street, had previously been occupied by an unused property known as "Church House". The foundation stone for the new building was laid by George Charles Cherry of Denford Park on 7 September 1870. It was designed by John Money in the Italianate style, was built by a local contactor, a Mr Hoskins, at a cost of £4,000 and was opened without ceremony on 11 October 1871.

The design involved an asymmetrical main frontage with four bays facing onto the High Street; the left-hand section of three bays formed a loggia, with a balustraded balcony and three rounded headed windows on the first floor and a parapet above. The right-hand bay, which slightly projected forwards, contained an arched doorway on the ground floor, a balcony and a double-arched window with an elaborate carving in the tympanum on the first floor and a clock tower with a lead cupola and weather vane above. Internally, the principal meeting rooms were at the front (the magistrates' room on the ground floor and the upper hall on the first floor), and there was a corn exchange, with a vaulted ceiling, at the rear. The chiming clock, made by J. Moore & Sons of Clerkenwell, had been presented by the magistrate's clerk, Mr W. R. Hall, in 1866; it had initially been housed in a newly built clock tower atop the Georgian town hall, before being transferred (along with the bells) to the new building in 1871.

The corn exchange was converted for use as a large meeting hall in 1923 and it served as a British Restaurant during the Second World War. The building served as the meeting place of Hungerford Rural District Council for much of the 20th century but ceased to be local seat of government when the enlarged West Berkshire Council was formed in 1974. However, meetings of Hungerford Town Council continued to take place in the building. The constable i.e. mayor and other officers of the town continued to be elected in the town hall each Hocktide (second Tuesday after Easter).
