= NWN =

NWN may refer to:

As an abbreviation:

- Neverwinter Nights, a Dungeons & Dragons-based video game series
- Newton for Hyde railway station, a railway station in England
- North Williamstown railway station, Melbourne, a railway station in Australia
- New Wrestling Nation, a Canadian professional wrestling promotion based in Île-des-Chênes
- Newbury Weekly News, an English local weekly newspaper
- NW Natural, a natural gas distributor in Portland, Oregon

In religion:

- An alternate spelling for the Egyptian god Nu
