= Greenham =

Village in Berkshire, England

Coordinates: 51°23′N 1°18′W

- Village
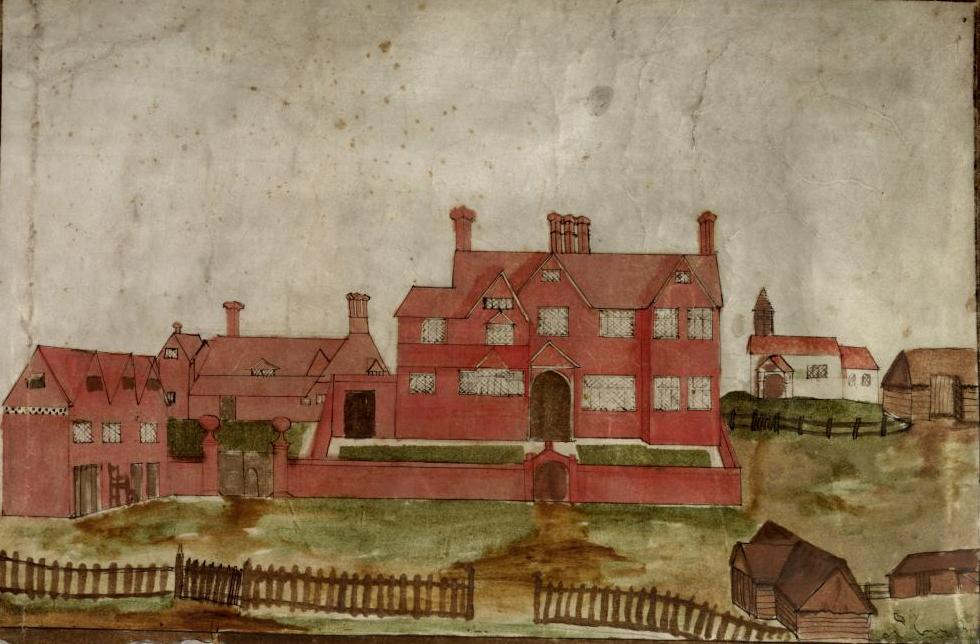
- Drawing of Greenham Manor House, circa 1700

- Location within Berkshire
- Area: 13.6 km^{2} (5.3 sq mi)
- Population: 937 ^{(2011)}
  - Density: 69/km^{2} (180/sq mi)
- OS grid reference: SU 48326529
- Civil parish: Greenham
- Unitary authority: West Berkshire
- Ceremonial county: Berkshire
- Region: South East
- Country: England
- Sovereign state: United Kingdom
- Post town: NEWBURY
- Postcode district: RG14
- Dialling code: 01635
- Police: Thames Valley
- Fire: Royal Berkshire
- Ambulance: South Central
- UK Parliament: Newbury

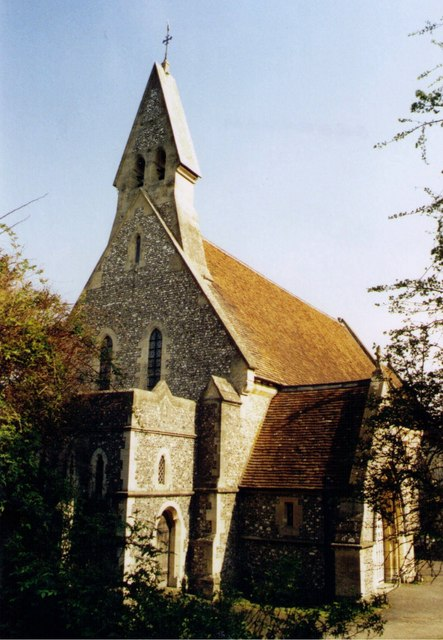
St Mary's Church

Greenham is a village and civil parish in Berkshire, England. Greenham commences immediately south-east of Newbury and is in West Berkshire. It was recorded in the Domesday Book as Greneham.

== Governance ==
Greenham was originally a tithing in the parish of Thatcham. In 1878, the northern part was given to Newbury and the southern part became its own parish. West Berkshire administers local government; certain minor local services such as footpaths and sports facilities received grants from the precept of the parish council, formed of residents. The population of the civil parish was 937 at the 2011 Census. The area of the village, in its broad, traditional definition, including the racecourse, common land and airfield, is 13.6 square kilometres (5.3 sq mi).

== Amenities ==
Greenham's parish church of St Mary was built between 1875 and 1895 by Henry Woodyer in the Early English style. It is a Grade II* listed building. There is a public open space by the church, called Audrey's Meadow after local councillor, Audrey Appleby, administered by the Berkshire, Buckinghamshire and Oxfordshire Wildlife Trust. Schools in the parish include Mary Hare primary school in the village itself, Highwood Copse primary school, St Gabriel's School at Sandleford Priory and Newbury College.

== Transport ==
Newbury Racecourse railway station is within the parish, served by Great Western Railway local services from Paddington to Newbury and Bedwyn. Services are augmented on race days. The A339 from Basingstoke runs along the southern edge of the parish before heading north along the former alignment of the A34 into the centre of Newbury. The Kennet and Avon Canal runs along the north-western edge of the parish. The racecourse incorporates an airfield for general aviation use on race days.

== Housing ==
An area separating southern Newbury from Greenham, sometimes referred to by locals as the 'Greenham Gap', has historically been free of housing, but a development of 36 houses was completed in this area in 2020 and outline plans for further housing were approved in 2017 and 2018, amidst concerns about traffic management and local rights of way.

== Industry ==
Newbury Racecourse is within the northern border of the parish. The Greenham Industrial Estate is in the south-eastern corner, beyond the former RAF Greenham Common, which occupied much of the common between 1942 and 1992.

== Demography ==
2011 Published Statistics: Population, home ownership and extracts from Physical Environment, surveyed in 2005
Output area	Homes owned outright	Owned with a loan	Socially rented	Privately rented	Other	km^{2} roads	km^{2} water	km^{2} domestic gardens	Usual residents	km^{2}
Civil parish	126	146	50	70	9	0.258	0.039	0.246	937	13.6

== See also ==
- List of civil parishes in Berkshire
