= Lyford =

Lyford may refer to:

== People ==
- John Lyford (c. 1580 – 1634), the first ordained minister to come to the Plymouth Colony
- Ralph Lyford (1882 – 1927), an American composer and conductor
- William Lyford (1598–1653), an English nonconformist clergyman

== Places ==
- Lyford, Indiana, USA
- Lyford, Oxfordshire, England
- Lyford, Texas, USA
- Lyford Cay, Bahamas
- Mount Lyford, New Zealand
