= Newbury Rural District =

History of Berkshire

Coordinates: 51.3982°N 1.3269°W

- Rural district
- Population
  - 1901: 9,996
  - 1971: 22,865
- History
  - Created: 28 December 1894
  - Abolished: 31 March 1974
  - Succeeded by: Newbury
  - HQ: Newbury
- Contained within
  - County Council: Berkshire
- Map of boundary as of 1971

Newbury Rural District was a rural district in Berkshire, England from 1894 to 1974, covering an area in the south-west of the county which almost surrounded but did not include the town of Newbury.

== Evolution ==
The district had its origins in the Newbury Rural Sanitary District. This had been created under the Public Health Act 1872, giving public health and local government responsibilities for rural areas to the existing boards of guardians of poor law unions. The Newbury Rural Sanitary District covered the area of the Newbury Poor Law Union with the exception the town of Newbury, which was a municipal borough and so formed its own urban sanitary district. The poor law union and rural sanitary district were administered from Newbury Union Workhouse, which had been built in 1836 on Newtown Road in Newbury.

Under the Local Government Act 1894, rural sanitary districts became rural districts from 28 December 1894. The act also directed that rural districts should not straddle county boundaries, and parishes should not straddle district boundaries. The Newbury Rural Sanitary District had included the parish of Newtown in Hampshire; it was decided before the act came into force that Newtown would transfer to the Kingsclere Rural District to allow it to stay in Hampshire. The parishes of Greenham and Speen had previously been partly within the municipal borough of Newbury and partly outside it, but they had their boundaries adjusted to add the parts within the borough to the parish of Newbury.

== Parishes ==
Newbury Rural District contained the following civil parishes:

Parish	From	To	Notes
Boxford	28 Dec 1894	31 Mar 1974	
Brimpton	28 Dec 1894	31 Mar 1974	
Chieveley	28 Dec 1894	31 Mar 1974	
Cold Ash	28 Dec 1894	31 Mar 1974	Parish created 4 December 1894 from part of Thatcham.
Enborne	28 Dec 1894	31 Mar 1974	
Greenham	28 Dec 1894	31 Mar 1974	Parish absorbed most of abolished Sandleford parish in 1934.
Hampstead Marshall	28 Dec 1894	31 Mar 1974	
Hermitage	1 Apr 1969	31 Mar 1974	Transferred from Wantage Rural District.
Leckhampstead	28 Dec 1894	31 Mar 1974	
Midgham	28 Dec 1894	31 Mar 1974	
Sandleford	28 Dec 1894	31 Mar 1934	Parish abolished and area absorbed into Greenham parish on 1 April 1934, except small area added to Newbury.
Shaw cum Donnington	28 Dec 1894	31 Mar 1974	
Speen	28 Dec 1894	31 Mar 1974	
Thatcham	28 Dec 1894	31 Mar 1974	
Wasing	28 Dec 1894	31 Mar 1974	
Welford	28 Dec 1894	31 Mar 1974	
Winterbourne	28 Dec 1894	31 Mar 1974	
Woolhampton	28 Dec 1894	31 Mar 1974	

== Premises ==
Newbury Rural District Council held its first meeting on 3 January 1895 at Newbury Town Hall, when Albert Richard Tull of Crookham House, Thatcham, was appointed the first chairman of the council. He was a Conservative, and had been the previous chairman of the board of guardians.

In its early years, the council generally met at the workhouse on Newtown Road, Newbury. Around 1929 the council moved to Phoenix House at 50 Bartholomew Street, Newbury, converting it for use as both offices and meeting place. (Note: The council is not listed separately in the telephone directory until the early 1930s, but the 1928 Telephone Directory has the board of guardians based at "Clerk's Office, Kendrick House, The Wharf", whilst the 1929 directory has them based at "Clerk's Office, Phoenix House, Bartholomew Street". The 1929 Municipal Year Book says the council's offices were at "Union Offices, Newbury" and that it met at Kendrick House, whereas the 1930 Municipal Year Book says the council both met and had its offices at Phoenix House.) The council remained at Phoenix House until its abolition in 1974.

== Abolition ==
Newbury Rural District was abolished under the Local Government Act 1972, becoming part of the new district of Newbury on 1 April 1974, which in turn became West Berkshire in 1998.
