= Wokingham (disambiguation) =

Wokingham is a town in Berkshire, England.

Wokingham may also refer to:

- Wokingham and Emmbrook F.C., formerly Wokingham Town, an English football club
- Wokingham railway station
- Wokingham (UK Parliament constituency)
- Borough of Wokingham, a local government district
- Wokingham Rural District, a former local government district

== See also ==
- Woking, a town in Surrey
