= Hamstead Marshall =

Coordinates: 51°23′13″N 1°24′29″W

- Village and civil parish
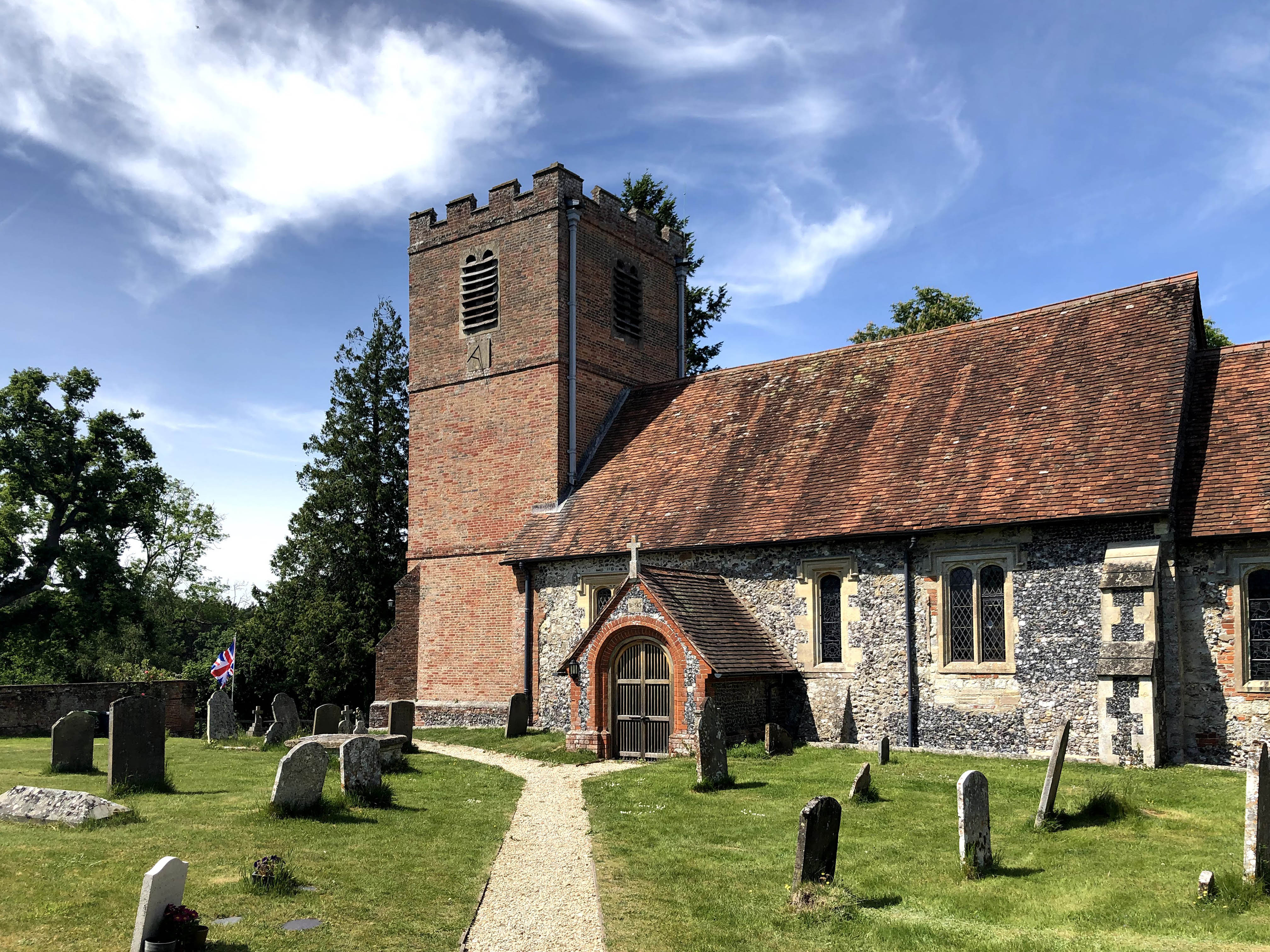
- St Mary's Church

- Location within Berkshire
- Population: 275 (2011 census)
- Civil parish: Hampstead Marshall
- Unitary authority: West Berkshire
- Shire county: Berkshire
- Region: South East
- Country: England
- Sovereign state: United Kingdom

Hamstead Marshall (also spelt Hampstead Marshall) (Note: The spelling of the village's name that is used on road signs and that is accepted by most of the village's organisations is Hamstead Marshall; an alternative, Hampstead Marshall, was preferred from time to time, but is not used by the local authority today, although it is the official name of the civil parish.) is a village and civil parish in the English county of Berkshire. The village is located within the North Wessex Downs. The population of this civil parish at the 2011 census was 275.

== Location and amenities ==
In the west of the unitary authority area of West Berkshire, south-west of Newbury, on the Berkshire-Hampshire border, the parish covers 7.78 km^{2} (3 sq mi), having lost territory in a boundary change of 1991. The village contains scattered settlements such as Ash Tree Corner, Chapel Corner, Holtwood, and Irish Hill. There is a 12th-century church (St Mary's), canine rescue kennels, and the White Hart Inn, Hamstead Marshall's pub for several centuries. The present village hall served until 1933 as the local primary school; it now hosts regular community events as well as private bookings. The former Organic Research Centre at Elm Farm closed in 2019 and its land and buildings sold off.

== History ==
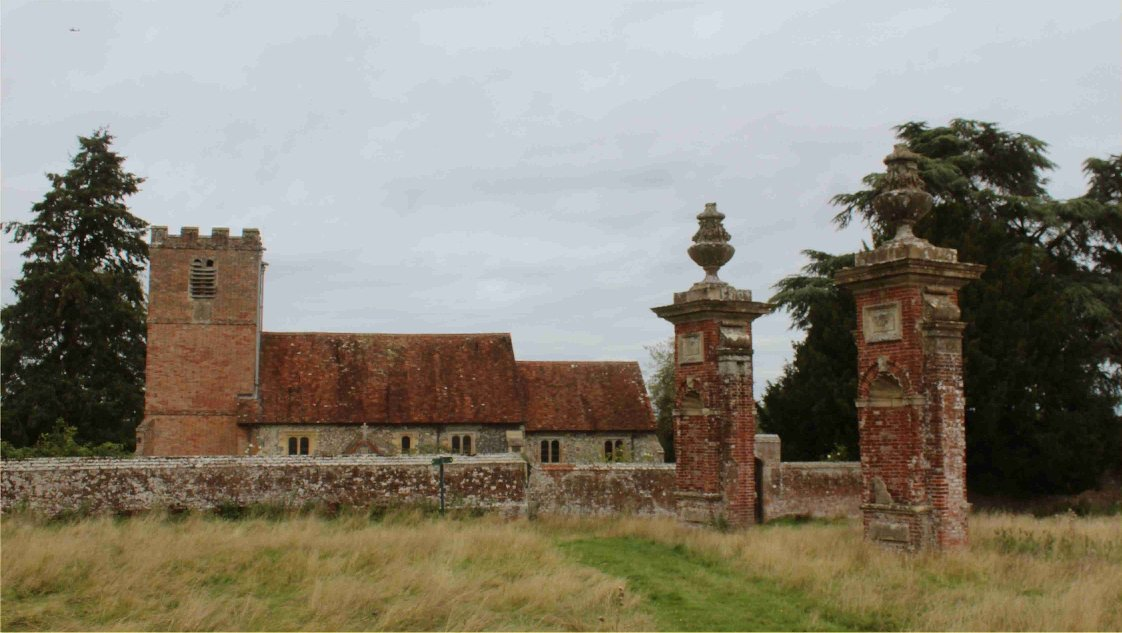
Isolated Gateway in a field south of the church

Hamstead Marshall has three sites of medieval motte-and-bailey castles, all on private land, with one a possible site of Newbury Castle. All are registered historic monuments. William Marshall, who became Earl of Pembroke, was a loyal knight to four kings: Henry II, Richard I, King John, and Henry III and this is when the Marshall suffix was added to the village.

The village was, from 1620 until the 1980s, the seat of the Earls of Craven. William Craven built a mansion there, originally intended as a residence for Charles I's sister, Elizabeth of Bohemia, although she died before construction began. It burnt down in 1718. In a large field near the church are four sets of gateway pillars, minus the gates or any surrounding remains of buildings. The Cravens later expanded a hunting lodge to live in instead, and this still stands, privately occupied, in the centre of Hamstead Park. Until the mid-twentieth century the Craven family owned most of the village, but successive sales by the estate put almost all the houses into private ownership by 1980, most of them now owner-occupied.

== Geography ==
The village landscape comprises farmland, woodland and parkland. No A or B roads traverse this but Hamstead Marshall has bus services. The River Kennet and the Kennet and Avon Canal pass through the northern edge of the village, and the River Enborne marks the southern boundary. About half the property pre-dates 1900, and 32 buildings or structures such as walls are listed buildings. The village has four areas designated sites of Special Scientific Interest (SSSI), these are Hamstead Marshall Pit, Irish Hill Copse, Redhill Wood and the River Kennet.

== Demography ==
2011 Published Statistics: Population, home ownership and extracts from Physical Environment, surveyed in 2005
Output area	Homes owned outright	Owned with a loan	Socially rented	Privately rented	Other	km^{2} roads	km^{2} water	km^{2} domestic gardens	Usual residents	km^{2}
Civil parish	45	31	17	15	10	0.083	0.185	0.176	275	7.78
