= West Ilsley =

Village and civil parish in Berkshire, England

Coordinates: 51°32′24″N 1°19′08″W

- Village and civil parish
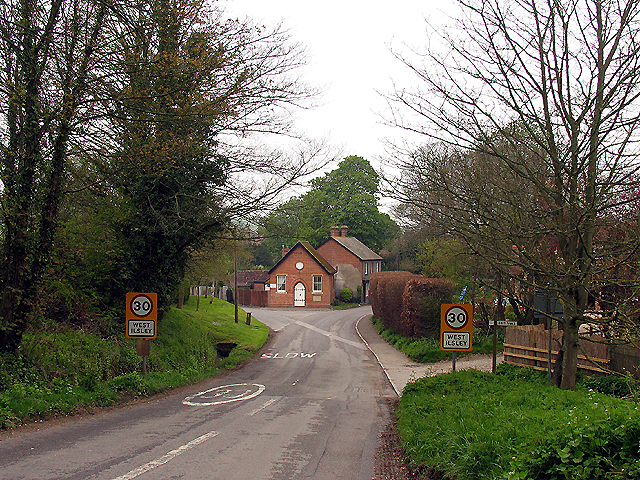
- The road into West Ilsley

- Location within Berkshire
- Population: 332 (2011 census)
- Civil parish: Compton
- Unitary authority: West Berkshire District Council
- Ceremonial county: Berkshire
- Region: South East
- Country: England
- Sovereign state: United Kingdom
- Post town: Newbury
- Postcode district: RG20
- Dialling code: 01635
- Police: Thames Valley
- Fire: Royal Berkshire
- Ambulance: South Central
- UK Parliament: Reading West and Mid Berkshire
- Website: West Ilsley parish council website

West Ilsley is a village and civil parish in Berkshire, England. The population of the village at the 2011 Census was 332.

== Location and amenities ==
It is situated in West Berkshire, north of Newbury on the Berkshire Downs. The companion village of East Ilsley is approximately a mile to the southeast. West Ilsley has a public house, The Harrow, and a well supported cricket club. The Ridgeway passes within a mile of the village.

== History ==
The word Ilsley is derived from Hilde-Laege which means "Place of conflict", and either West or East Ilsley may be the site of the Battle of Ashdown, Alfred the Great's victory against the Danes. The original Morland Brewery was first set up in West Ilsley in 1711.

== Church ==
The parish church of All Saints dates back to the 12th century. It is now one of nine village churches in the East Downland benefice, which is part of the Newbury Deanery in the Diocese of Oxford. In 1616, the Italian Archbishop, Marco Antonio de Dominis was appointed Dean of Windsor and Rector of West Ilsley by King James I. His successor, Dr Godfrey Goodman, sheltered King Charles I at West Ilsley Rectory during the English Civil War. In the churchyard are two trees planted by Queen Victoria's daughter Princess Helena and her husband Prince Christian, to commemorate the rebuilding of the church's chancel in 1878.

== Transport ==
West Ilsley is served by Newbury and District bus services 6 and 6A from Newbury.

== Notable residents ==
- Marco Antonio de Dominis for a time lived in West Ilsley.
- Edmund Kerchever Chambers, Medieval and Renaissance scholar
- Horse Trainer Mick Channon (the former Southampton footballer), who moved into the village after buying the stables of the former Queen's trainer, Dick Hern.

== See also ==
- List of places in Berkshire
- List of civil parishes in Berkshire
