= Stanford Dingley =

Coordinates: 51°26′24″N 1°10′16″W

- Village and civil parish
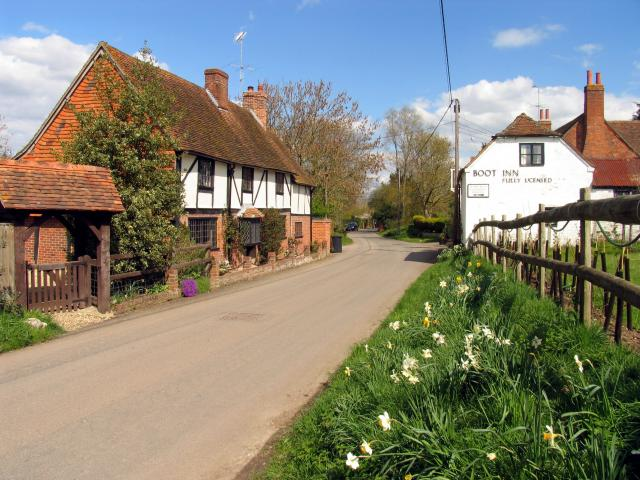
- 15th-century building and The Old Boot Inn

- Location within Berkshire
- Area: 4.82 km^{2} (1.86 sq mi)
- Population: 179 (2011 census)
  - Density: 37/km^{2} (96/sq mi)
- OS grid reference: SU575715
  - London: 45.4 miles (73.1 km)
- Civil parish: Stanford Dingley
- Unitary authority: West Berkshire
- Ceremonial county: Berkshire
- Region: South East
- Country: England
- Sovereign state: United Kingdom
- Post town: READING
- Postcode district: RG7
- Dialling code: 0118
- Police: Thames Valley
- Fire: Royal Berkshire
- Ambulance: South Central
- UK Parliament: Newbury

Stanford Dingley is a small village and civil parish in West Berkshire, England, between Newbury and Theale.

== Geography ==
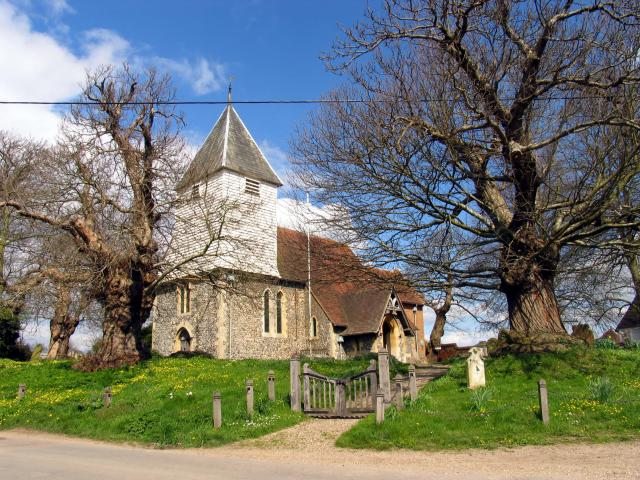
St Denys's parish church, next to Manor Farm

Stanford Dingley fills part of both sides of the valley of the upper River Pang, on the minor roads between the A4 Bath Road and the M4 motorway. The parish mostly consists of farmland, with some woodland in the upland regions. The southern parish boundary runs along the edge of the woodland on the northern slopes of Clay Hill. The official and actual northern boundary is the motorway which is buffered by the area's only area of woodlands, covering about a fifth of the total area. Bucklebury lies to the west and Bradfield to the east. The village spreads north–south along Cock Lane, which runs between Bradfield Southend and Yattendon. Slightly detached to the south is the hamlet of Jennetts Hill and to the north is 'The Buildings'. The pond complex around the 'Blue Pool', containing artesian aquifers, though generally thought of as part of Stanford Dingley is actually just across the parish boundary in Bradfield.

== History ==
Stanford is from the Old English for "Stoney-Ford", perhaps indicating a Roman river-crossing of the river Pang heading towards Dorchester-on-Thames. Dingley was the name of the lords of the manor. One of their wives has a monumental brass in the 12th century Church of England parish church of Saint Denys. The church has remnants of the original Anglo-Saxon church within its inner walls. The main door and the wall paintings in the nave date from the 13th century and the white wooden bell tower was built in the 15th century. The churchyard is notable for a number of sweet chestnut trees. The church is a Grade I listed building.

=== Notable residents ===
- Thomas Tesdale, the founding benefactor of Pembroke College, Oxford, was born in Stanford Dingley in 1547.
- Robert Gathorne-Hardy (31 July 1902 – 11 February 1973) was an English garden writer.

== Amenities ==
There are two pubs in the village, the 15th century Bull Inn, a Grade II listed building, and the 18th-century Old Boot Inn, also Grade II listed.

=== Parish ===
Stanford Dingley is an ecclesiastical parish in the Church of England, recorded as such in the Domesday Book. It shares in events and clergy with the benefice of Bucklebury and Bradfield.

== Demography ==
2011 Published Statistics: Population, home ownership and extracts from Physical Environment, surveyed in 2005
Output area	Homes owned outright	Owned with a loan	Socially rented	Privately rented	Other	km^{2} roads	km^{2} water	km^{2} domestic gardens	Usual residents	km^{2}
Civil parish	33	25	9	11	3	0.040	0.016	0.151	179	4.82

== See also ==
- List of places in Berkshire
- List of civil parishes in Berkshire
