= Hamstead Marshall Pit =

Protected area in Berkshire, England

- Site of Special Scientific Interest
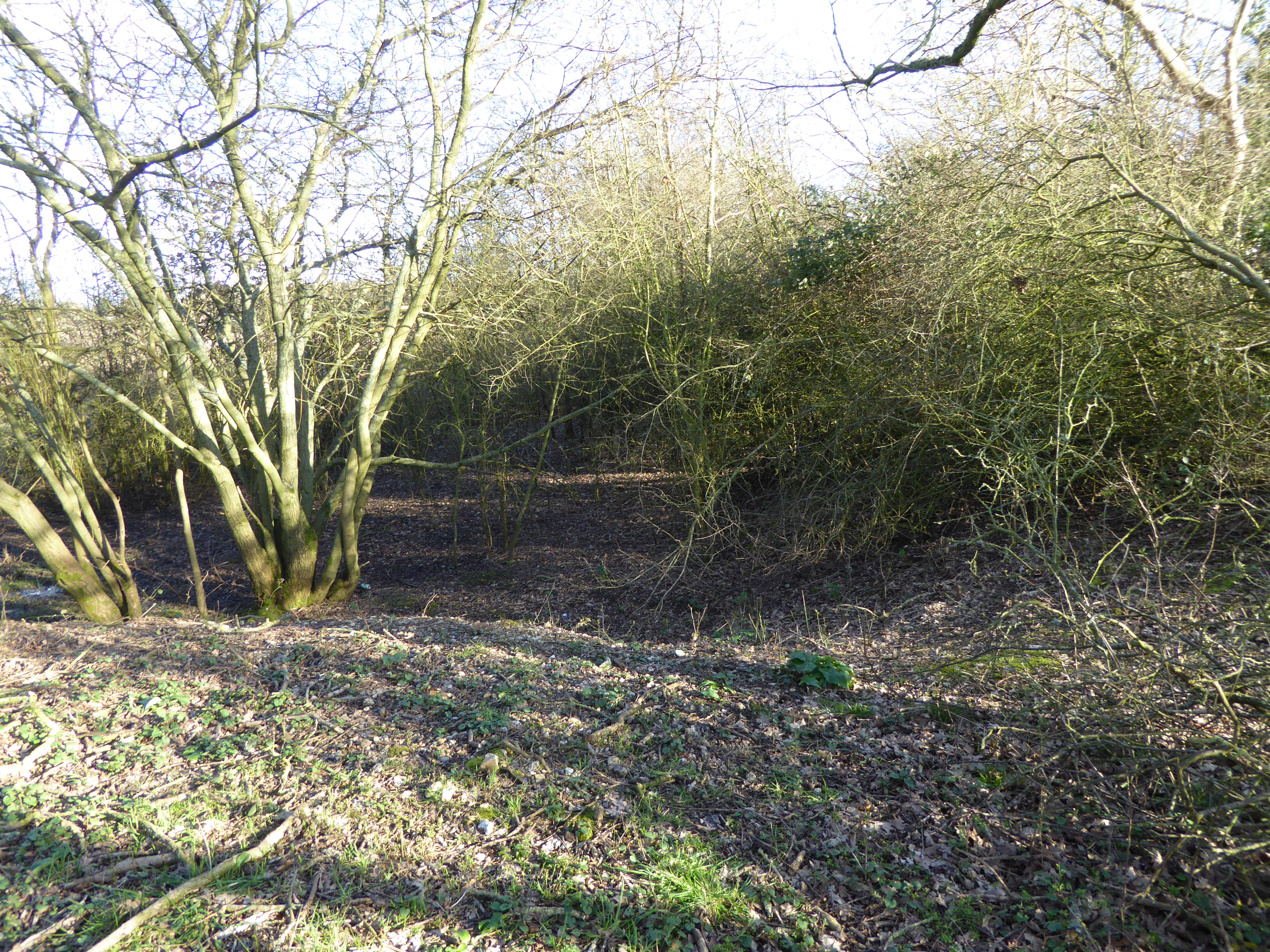

- Location within Berkshire
- Location of Hamstead Marshall Pit.
- Area of search: Berkshire
- Grid reference: SU 414 662
- Coordinates: 51.393°N 1.406°W
- Interest: Geological
- Area: 0.2 hectares (0.49 acres)
- Notification date: 1985
- Location map: Magic Map

Hamstead Marshall Pit is a 0.2-hectare (0.49-acre) geological Site of Special Scientific Interest north of Hamstead Marshall in Berkshire. It is a Geological Conservation Review site.

This former gravel pit exposes gravels of the River Kennet, which were deposited around 450,000 years ago, during the Anglian ice age. Flint hand axes found on the site may be even older, showing that early humans were active in the Middle Palaeolithic in the area.
