= Brightwalton =

Coordinates: 51.511°N 1.384°W

- Village
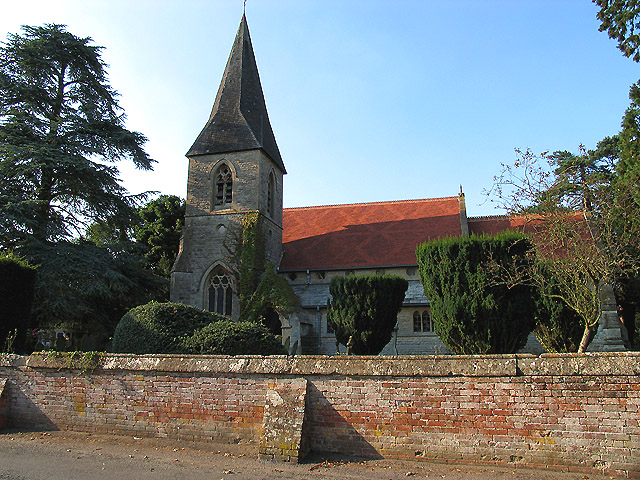
- All Saints' parish church

- Location within Berkshire
- Area: 8.45 km^{2} (3.26 sq mi)
- Population: 366 (2011 census)
  - Density: 43/km^{2} (110/sq mi)
- OS grid reference: SU4279
- Civil parish: Brightwalton
- Unitary authority: West Berkshire
- Ceremonial county: Berkshire
- Region: South East
- Country: England
- Sovereign state: United Kingdom
- Post town: Newbury
- Postcode district: RG20
- Dialling code: 01488
- Police: Thames Valley
- Fire: Royal Berkshire
- Ambulance: South Central
- UK Parliament: Newbury
- Website: Brightwalton Web Site

Brightwalton is a village and civil parish in the Berkshire Downs centred 7 miles (11 km) NNW of Newbury in West Berkshire.

== Name ==
The name of the village is first recorded in a charter in 939, where it was called Beorhtwaldingtune. It likely meant 'estate associated with Beorhtwald', an Old English personal name.

== Parish church ==
The Church of England parish church of All Saints existed by the time of Domesday Book of 1086. During the 19th century, the church was deemed too small to accommodate a growing congregation, the village having reached 470 population, and was demolished in 1861. Philip Wroughton of Woolley Park, funded the work, including denotation of a sturdily built tower, and commissioned a replacement, completed 1863 It was built in the Gothic Revival style by G E Street, who was architect to the Diocese of Oxford. Street retained and re-used some 13th century Early English Gothic features from the original building.

== School ==
The parish has a Church of England primary school. It too was designed by Street and built in 1863.

== Transport ==
Bus travel from Newbury is provided by service 107.

== Notable residents ==
In about 1715 the Savo(u)ry family moved to the village from nearby South Moreton. The Savorys were wheelwrights, but William Savory (1768–1824) from a third generation of the family, was apprenticed to David Jones, an apothecary in Newbury, Berkshire. Aged 20, Savory "walked the wards" of St Thomas' Hospital and Guy's Hospital in London. He learned surgery, physic (medicine) and midwifery from the leading practitioners of their day, including the surgeon Henry Cline and physician William Saunders. Some of his student notes and his commonplace book survive. Savory became a member of the Company of Surgeons and initially practiced in Newbury. Following bankruptcy in 1795 he re-settled in Brightwalton, where he remained for the rest of his life, passing the mantle to his son, William Savory (1793–1856) who studied at the London Hospital in Whitechapel.

Sir Samuel Eyre (1638–98), Justice of the King's Bench, lived in the parish, having inherited the manor of Brightwalton in 1694 through his wife Lady Martha Lucy. Their son Robert Eyre, also of Brightwalton, became Lord Chief Justice.

The author Monica Dickens lived in the village in the last years of her life. Prolific children's author Rosemary Hayes went to school locally.

== Demography ==
2011 Published Statistics: Population, home ownership and extracts from Physical Environment, surveyed in 2005
Output area	Homes owned outright	Owned with a loan	Socially rented	Privately rented	Other	km^{2} roads	km^{2} water	km^{2} domestic gardens	Usual residents	km^{2}
Civil parish	44	52	19	20	7	0.076	0.001	0.132	366	8.45

== See also ==
- List of civil parishes in Berkshire
- List of places in Berkshire

== Sources ==
- Page, W.H.; Ditchfield, P.H., eds. (1924). A History of the County of Berkshire. Victoria County History. Vol. 4. assisted by John Hautenville Cope. London: The St Katherine Press. pp. 48–51.
- Pevsner, Nikolaus (1966). The Buildings of England: Berkshire. Harmondsworth: Penguin Books. pp. 101–102.
