= Goring Rural District =

Historical rural district

Coordinates: 51.51°N 1.09°W

Goring was a rural district in Oxfordshire, England from 1894 to 1932.

It was formed from that part of the Bradfield rural sanitary district which was in Oxfordshire, with the Berkshire part going to the Bradfield Rural District. It consisted of the three parishes of Goring, Mapledurham and Whitchurch.

The district was abolished in 1932 under a County Review Order, the parishes becoming part of the Henley Rural District.
