= Hocktide =

Days near to Easter

Hocktide (also Hock tide or Hoke Day) is the Monday and Tuesday in the second week after Easter. It was an English medieval festival; both the Tuesday and the preceding Monday were the Hock-days. Together with Whitsuntide and the twelve days of Christmastide, the week following Easter marked the only vacations of the husbandman's year, during slack times in the cycle of the year when the villein ceased work on his lord's demesne, and most likely on his own land as well.

== History ==
Hock-Tuesday was an important term day, rents being then payable, for with Michaelmas it divided the rural year into its winter and summer halves. Some evidence allows us to see that Hocktide was considered an important festival in some parts of Late-Medieval England, and was a chance for the women of the parish to raise money for the local church. Katherine French's work has allowed us to see that women would capture and tie up local men, and release them in exchange for a release fee, which would then be donated to the church.

George C. Homans notices the parallel pattern as at Christmastide, of a solemn feast of the Church, that of Christmas itself, followed by a festive holiday, with the agricultural round beginning anew after Epiphany, with the folk customs of Plow Monday. Until the 19th century in England, Plow Monday, the first Monday after Epiphany, occasioned the antics of the gang of young plowmen, calling themselves the "plow-bullocks", who went door to door with the caparisoned "white plow", collecting pennies; when these were withheld they might plow up the dooryard.

At Coventry there was a play called The Old Coventry Play of Hock Tuesday. This, suppressed at the Reformation owing to the incidental disorder that accompanied it, and revived as part of the festivities on Queen Elizabeth's visit to Kenilworth in July 1575, depicted the struggle between Saxons and Danes, and has given colour to the suggestion that hock-tide was originally a commemoration of the massacre of the Danes on St. Brice's Day, 13 November 1002, or of the rejoicings at the death of Harthacanute on 8 June 1042 and the expulsion of the Danes. But the dates of these anniversaries do not bear this out.

Until the 16th century, Hocktide was widely celebrated in England after Easter, although the massacre of the Danes in 1002, by order of King Ethelred the Unready, took place around the feast of St Brice, on 13 November and Hardicanute's death in 1042 occurred on 8 June. The festivities were banned under Henry VIII as they were thought to encourage public disorder, but Elizabeth I was petitioned to reinstate the tradition in 1575, an event recorded in Sir Walter Scott's Kenilworth. How popular the revival was is not recorded, but a number of towns are known to have re-established the tradition. However, by the end of the 17th century the festival was largely forgotten.

By the 19th century the festivities consisted of the men of the parish binding the women on the Monday and demanding a kiss for their release. On the Tuesday, the actual Hock-day, the women would tie up the men and demand a payment before setting them free. The monies collected would then be donated to the parish funds. The origins of the name Hocktide are unknown. No trace of the word is found in Old English, and hock-day, its earliest use in composition, appears first in the 12th century. Hocktide and hock-money are first attested in 1484 (OED)

In 1910 the celebration at Hungerford began with a watercress supper at the "John o' Gaunt" (he being the patron of the place) where his wonderful horn, the town's most treasured possession, is kept. The supper consisted of black broth, Welsh rarebit, macaroni, and salad, with bowls of punch.

== Hocktide today ==
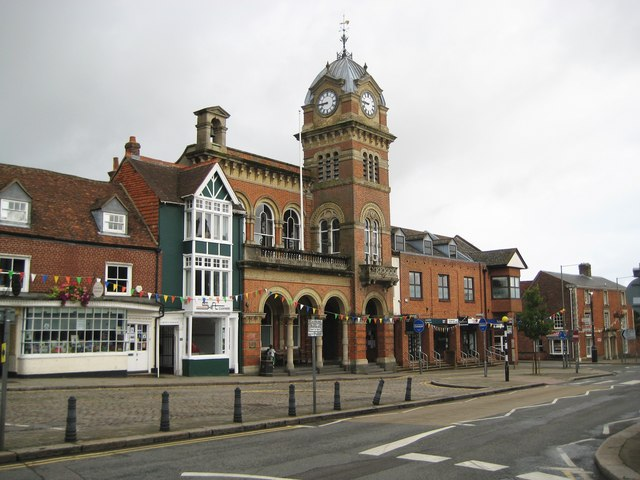
Hungerford Town Hall

In England as of 2026 the tradition survives only in Hungerford in Berkshire, although the festival was somewhat modified to celebrate the patronage of the Duchy of Lancaster. John of Gaunt, the 1st Duke of Lancaster, granted grazing rights and permission to fish in the River Kennet to the commoners of Hungerford. Despite a legal battle during the reign of Elizabeth I (1558–1603) when the Duchy attempted to regain the lucrative fishing rights, the case was eventually settled in the townspeople's favour after the Queen herself interceded. Hocktide in Hungerford now combines the ceremonial collecting of the rents with something of the previous tradition of demanding kisses or money.

Although the Hocktide celebrations take place over several days, the main festivities occur on the Tuesday, which is also known as Tutti Day. The Hocktide Council, which is elected on the previous Friday, appoints two Tutti Men whose job it is to visit the properties attracting Commoner's Rights. Formerly they collected rents, and they accompanied the Bellman (or Town crier) to summon commoners to attend the Hocktide Court in the Town Hall, and to fine those who were unable to attend one penny, in lieu of the loss of their rights. The Tutti Men carry Tutti Poles: wooden staffs topped with bunches of flowers and a cloved orange. These are thought to have derived from nosegays which would have mitigated the smell of some of the less salubrious parts of the town in times past. The Tutti Men are accompanied by the Orange Man (or Orange Scrambler) – who wears a hat decorated with feathers and carries a white sack filled with oranges – and Tutti Wenches who give out oranges and sweets to the crowds in return for pennies or kisses.

The proceedings start at 8am with the sounding of the horn from the Town Hall steps. This summons all the commoners to the attend the Court at 9am, after which the Tutti Men visit each of the 102 houses in turn. They no longer collect rents, but demand a penny or a kiss from the lady of the house when they visit. In return the Orange Man gives the owner an orange.

After the parade of the Tutti Men through the streets, the Hocktide Lunch takes place for the Hocktide Council, commoners and guests, at which the traditional "Plantagenet Punch" is served. After the meal, an initiation ceremony, known as Shoeing the Colts is held, in which all first-time attendees are shod by the blacksmith. Their legs are held and a nail is driven into their shoe. They are not released until they shout "Punch". Oranges and heated coins are then thrown from the Town Hall steps to the children gathered outside.

== See also ==
- Radonitsa
