= Audrey's Meadow =

Nature reserve in Berkshire

Coordinates: 51°23′24″N 1°18′09″W

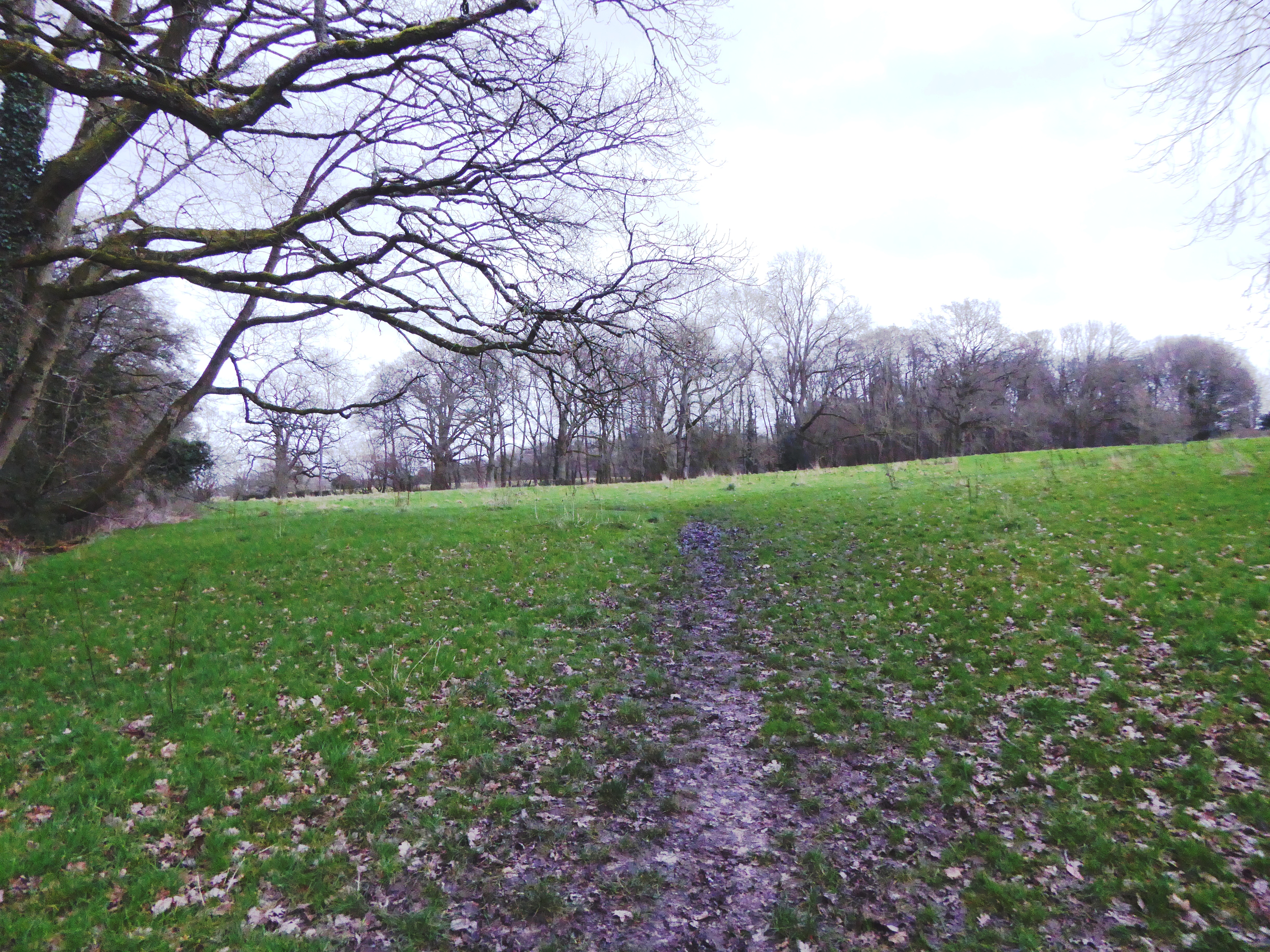
- Interactive map of Audrey's Meadow
- Type: Nature reserve
- Location: Newbury, Berkshire
- OS grid: SU 486 659
- Area: 2 hectares (4.9 acres)
- Manager: Berkshire, Buckinghamshire and Oxfordshire Wildlife Trust

Audrey's Meadow is a 2-hectare (4.9-acre) nature reserve in Newbury in Berkshire. It is owned by West Berkshire Council and managed by the Berkshire, Buckinghamshire and Oxfordshire Wildlife Trust.

== Geography and site ==
Audrey's Meadow contains a mixture of improved and semi-improved neutral grassland and wet woodland with ponds.

== History ==
In 2011 the meadow was adopted as a public open space and named after one of the parish councilors, Mrs Audrey Appleby. In 2014 it was transferred from West Berkshire Council to the Berkshire, Buckinghamshire and Oxfordshire Wildlife Trust.

== Fauna ==
The site has the following fauna:

=== Amphibians ===
- Common frog

=== Invertebrates ===
- Aeshna grandis
- Polyommatus icarus
- Anax imperator
- Ochlodes sylvanus
- Maniola jurtina
- Chorthippus parallelus
- Aphantopus hyperantus
- Metrioptera roeselii
- Argynnis paphia
- Thymelicus sylvestris
- Argiope bruennichi

=== Birds ===
- Parus caeruleus
- Parus major
- Poecile palustris
- Turdus philomelos

== Flora ==
The site has the following flora:

- Lamiastrum galeobdolon
- Melica uniflora
- Anemone nemorosa
- Conopodium majus
- Lathyrus pratensis
- Vicia sepium
- Hyacinthoides non-scripta
