= Windsor Rural District =

Historical rural district

Coordinates: 51.44°N 0.62°W

Map of boundary as of 1971

Windsor was a rural district in Berkshire, England from 1894 to 1974.

It was formed under the Local Government Act 1894 as a successor to the Windsor rural sanitary district. It consisted of the parishes of Clewer Without, Old Windsor, Sunningdale, and Sunninghill. Clewer Without was absorbed into the borough of New Windsor in 1920.

The district was abolished in 1974 under the Local Government Act 1972, going on to form part of the Windsor and Maidenhead district.
