= Irish Hill Copse =

Woodland in Berkshire, England

- Site of Special Scientific Interest
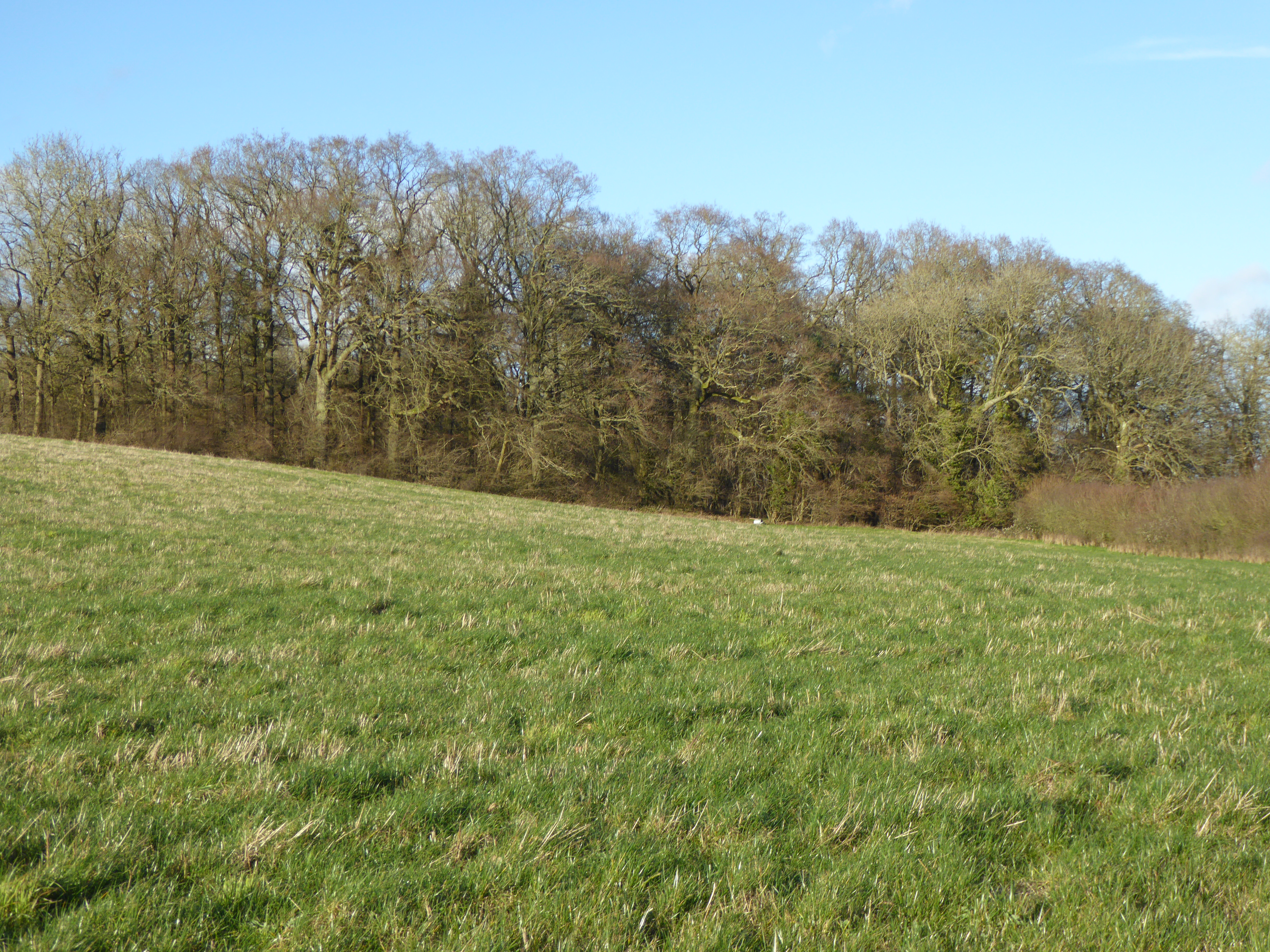

- Location within Berkshire
- Location of Irish Hill Copse.
- Area of search: Berkshire
- Grid reference: SU 404 670
- Coordinates: 51.40059°N 1.41920°W
- Interest: Biological
- Area: 15.9 hectares (39 acres)
- Notification date: 1984
- Location map: Magic Map

Irish Hill Copse is a 15.9-hectare (39-acre) biological Site of Special Scientific Interest east of Kintbury in Berkshire.

This site of coppiced ancient woodland includes an extensive area of calcareous ash/wych elm coppice on the hill sides, merging into wet ash/maple and acid oak/ash/hazel woodland with aspen, on the higher parts of the site. The lower slopes are dominated by Dog's Mercury (Mercurialis perennis), with abundant Herb Paris (Paris quadrifolia), Toothwort (Lathraea squamaria), Solomon's seal (Polygonatum multiflorum), Twayblade and Early Purple Orchids (Listera ovata) and Orchis mascula and, locally, Wild Daffodil (Narcissus pseudonarcissus).

The site is private land with no public access.
