= Newbury Weekly News =

English local weekly newspaper

The Newbury Weekly News
- Type: Weekly newspaper
- Format: Tabloid
- Owner(s): Newbury News and Media Limited
- Editor: Andy Murrill
- Founded: 1867
- Headquarters: Newspaper House; Faraday Road; Newbury; Berkshire; RG14 2DW
- Circulation: 6,824 (as of 2022)
- ISSN: 0961-9739
- OCLC number: 500150445
- Website: www.newburytoday.co.uk

The Newbury Weekly News is an English local weekly newspaper, covering Newbury and West Berkshire. The paper's website is known as Newbury Today. It is published by the Newbury Weekly News Group.

The Newbury Weekly News featured in a short Central Office of Information film in 1952, titled "Local Newspaper".

== History ==
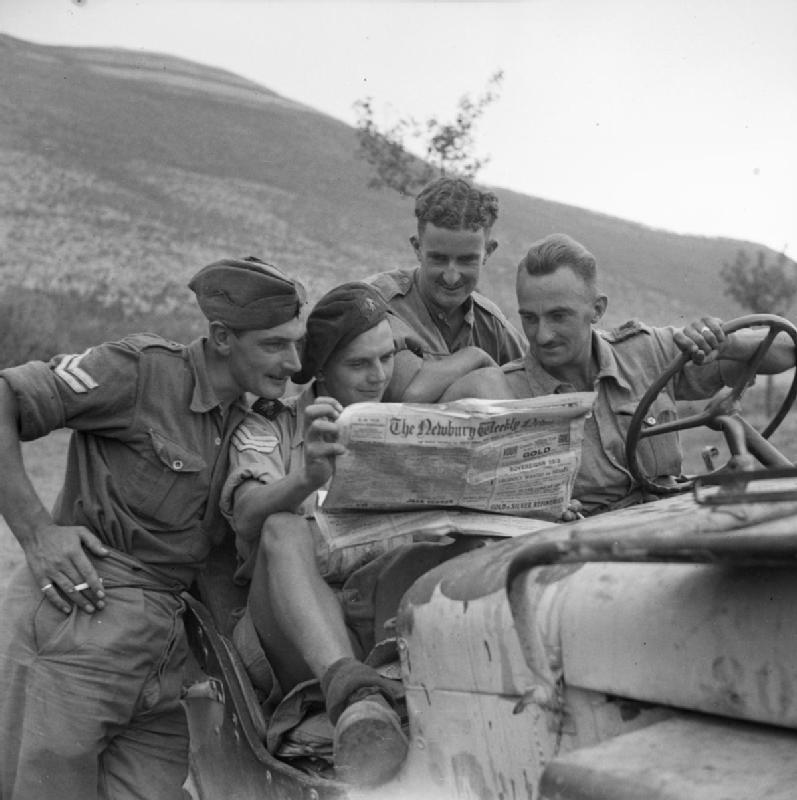
The British Army in Italy 1943: Men of the 2/6th Queen's Regiment read the Newbury Weekly News in their jeep, 29 September 1943.

The newspaper was first published in 1867 by Walter Blacket and Thomas Wheildon Turner. It has been independently and family-owned since its establishment, with Blacket Turner & Co being formed in the 1980s.

The paper celebrated its 150th anniversary in February 2017 with a special edition including a reprint of the first Newbury Weekly News newspaper.

On 1 May 2019, the paper was sold to Iliffe Media Group.

== Circulation ==
The newspaper's catchment covers an area of 300 square miles (780 km^{2}) and a population of around 150,000. In the company's certificate of circulation (circulation published in February 2016 by the Audit Bureau of Circulations), the average circulation per issue was 13,810.

== Awards ==
In 2006, the newspaper won The Newspaper Society's Best Paid-For Weekly Newspaper award. The newspaper's website was voted Best Website Produced by a Weekly Newspaper.

In 2007, Newbury Today was named the Picture Editors’ Newspaper Website of the Year, an award it shared with The Sun.

In 2019, Newbury Weekly News won the Society of Editor’s Regional Press Awards Best paid for weekly newspaper (circulation above 10000) category. A NWN photographer was also shortlisted for the Weekly Photographer of the Year at the event.
