= Frank Stanmore =

Frank Stanmore may refer to:

- Frank Stanmore (actor) (1877–1943), English actor
- Frank Stanmore (rugby league) (1929–2005), Australian rugby league footballer
