= William Lyford =

English clergyman (1598–1653)

William Lyford (1598–1653) was an English nonconformist clergyman, elected to the Westminster Assembly though not sitting in it.

== Life ==
Lyford was born at Peasemore, near Newbury in Berkshire, the son of the rector, an elder William Lyford and his wife, Mary Smith. He entered Magdalen Hall, Oxford, as a commoner on 26 April 1615, became a demy of Magdalen College in 1617, and graduated B.A. on 16 December 1618. He proceeded M.A. on 14 June 1621 (incorporated at Cambridge 1623), and B.D. 12 May 1631. On the presentation of John Digby, 1st Earl of Bristol, he became vicar of Sherborne, Dorset, in 1631.

His Calvinistic views left him undisturbed during the civil war; he was chosen member of the Westminster Assembly, but did not sit. In 1653 he was allowed an annuity out of Lord Digby's estate. Lyford died at Sherborne on 3 October 1653, and was buried under the communion table in the chancel of the church. By his wife Elizabeth he left children.

== Works ==
Lyford published:

- Principles of Faith and Good Conscience digested into a Catechistical Form, London, 1642; 5th edit. Oxford, 1658.
- An Apology for our Public Ministry and Infant Baptism, London, 1653; 3rd edit. 1657.

Posthumous were:

- The Plain Man's Senses exercised to discern both Good and Evil, London, 1655, with a funeral sermon by W. H., D.D., which was also issued separately.
- William Lyford his Legacy, or a Help for Young People to prepare them for the Sacrament, London, 1656; 2nd edit. 1658.
- Cases of Conscience propounded in the Time of Rebellion resolved, London, 1661.

Lyford edited in 1634 the second edition of William Pinke's Tryall of a Christians syncere Love unto Christ.
