= Cookham Rural District =

Former rural district in Berkshire, England

Coordinates: 51.500°N 0.785°W

Map of boundary as of 1971

Cookham was a rural district in Berkshire, England from 1894 to 1974.

The district was formed by the Local Government Act 1894 as a successor to the Cookham rural sanitary district. It continued in existence until 1974, when it was abolished under the Local Government Act 1972, forming part of the new Windsor and Maidenhead district.

== Civil parishes ==
The district contained the following civil parishes during its existence:

- Bisham
- Bray
- Cookham
- Cox Green
- Hurley
- Shottesbrooke
- Waltham St Lawrence
- White Waltham
