= Peasemore =

Coordinates: 51.492°N 1.341°W

- Village
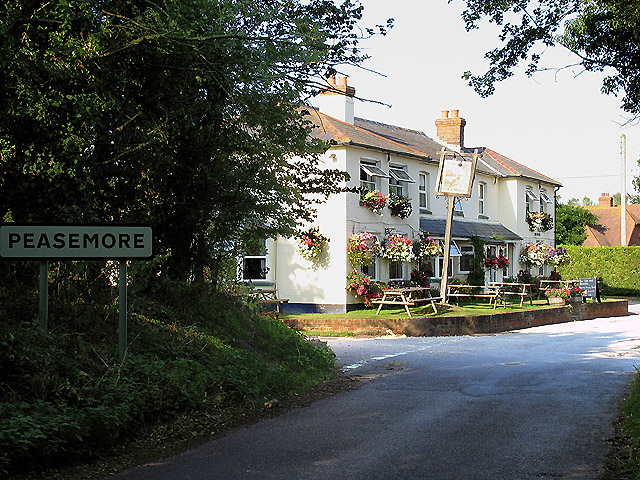
- The Fox & Hounds public house

- Location within Berkshire
- Area: 8.29 km^{2} (3.20 sq mi)
- Population: 311 (2011 census)
  - Density: 38/km^{2} (98/sq mi)
- OS grid reference: SU4677
- Civil parish: Peasemore
- Unitary authority: West Berkshire
- Ceremonial county: Berkshire
- Region: South East
- Country: England
- Sovereign state: United Kingdom
- Post town: Newbury
- Postcode district: RG20
- Dialling code: 01635
- Police: Thames Valley
- Fire: Royal Berkshire
- Ambulance: South Central
- UK Parliament: Newbury
- Website: www.peasemore.org.uk

Peasemore is a village and civil parish in the English ceremonial and historic county of Berkshire in the West Berkshire unitary authority area, west of the A34 road and north of the town of Newbury.

== Geography ==
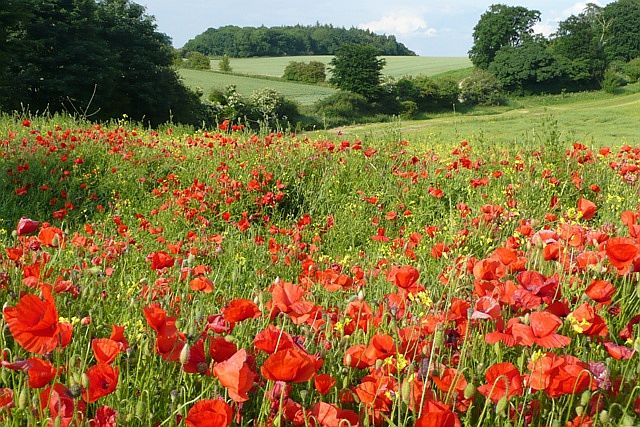
Fallow field of poppies, hay meadow and copse of woods in background, Peasemore

Peasemore is a small community with a typical clustered centre. A selection of footpaths lead across surrounding fields and across lanes into the Berkshire Downs which surround the village on all sides. All of the land of the village falls within this AONB. It is west of the A34, a dual carriageway trunk route between the M40 motorway and Southampton) and NNW of Newbury.

== History ==
Peasemore is mentioned in the Domesday Book of 1086. There is a plaque on the village hall relating to the entry. In 1978, Peasemore won Berkshire's best-kept village competition. The plaque for the award is placed in the entrance to St Barnabas' church, which is a Grade II listed building. The mainly mid-18th century church is one of many designed by G E Street.

== Amenities and sport ==
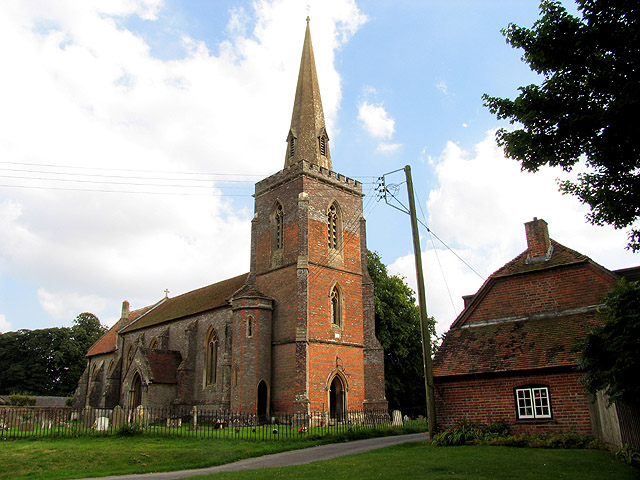
St Barnabas Church

Peasemore has a public house: The Fox at Peasemore. Its civil parish council hires out its village hall and hosts community and self-organised events. It has dance classes, children's parties, fitness training, exhibitions and social gatherings. Its Church of England parish church joins in the East Downland benefice organising weekday events for nine parishes north of Newbury. Peasemore Cricket Club is the main organised sporting activity. At the sports field is a children's adventure play area run using the parish council precept.

=== Former amenities ===
Peasemore had a village school, built in 1850, closed in the 1950s. Its own post office in Hailey Lane closed around 1980 and was converted to a private residence. Now, the nearest grocery shop and primary school are in Chieveley which hosts the majority of weekday church events.

== Transport ==
Since January 2024, bus services to Peasemore are operated by an on-demand system. Journeys can be booked on an app, by email or by telephone.

== Notable residents ==
- William Lyford, Anglican then non-Anglican clergyman and author, elected to the Westminster Assembly, rector (parish priest).
- Miss Read, author, temporary headmistress at Peasemore.
- David Cameron, former Prime Minister and Foreign Secretary, raised in Peasemore.

== Demography ==
2011 Published Statistics: Population, home ownership and extracts from Physical Environment, surveyed in 2005
| Output area | Homes owned outright | Owned with a loan | Socially rented | Privately rented | Other | km^{2} roads | km^{2} water | km^{2} domestic gardens | Usual residents | km^{2} |
|---|---|---|---|---|---|---|---|---|---|---|
| Civil parish | 39 | 40 | 24 | 13 | 6 | 0.076 | 0.007 | 0.115 | 311 | 8.29 |
