= Beedon =

Village in Berkshire, England

Coordinates: 51°28′59″N 1°18′11″W

- Village and civil parish
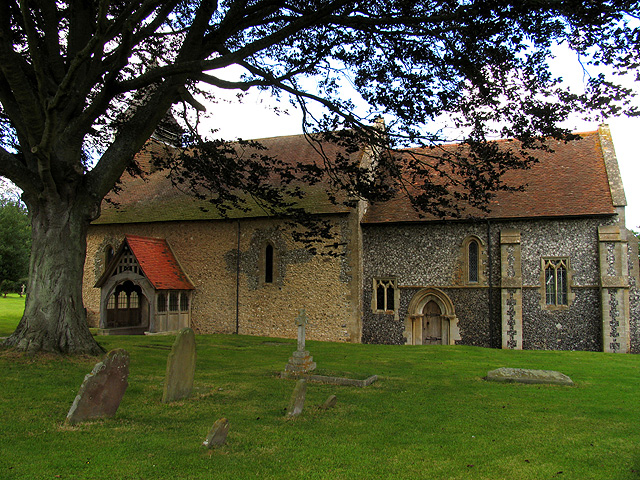
- Saint Nicholas Church

- Location within Berkshire
- Area: 8.05 km^{2} (3.11 sq mi)
- Population: 459 (2011 census)
  - Density: 57/km^{2} (150/sq mi)
- OS grid reference: SU4878
- Civil parish: Beedon
- Unitary authority: West Berkshire
- Ceremonial county: Berkshire
- Region: South East
- Country: England
- Sovereign state: United Kingdom
- Post town: Newbury
- Postcode district: RG20
- Dialling code: 01635
- Police: Thames Valley
- Fire: Royal Berkshire
- Ambulance: South Central
- UK Parliament: Reading West & Mid Berkshire

Beedon is a village and civil parish about 6.5 miles (10.5 km) north of Newbury in West Berkshire, England.

== Geography ==
The village has outlying farmhouses, surrounded by farmland and hedgerows, and is otherwise clustered around the old A34 Oxford Road, now unclassified, which runs through the village, parallel to the modern A34, with the latter acting as a bypass. The other village street, Stanmore Road, heads north west from Oxford Road, and has the parish church and village school.

=== Beedon Common ===
Beedon Common is a hamlet and former common in Beedon. The settlement lies close to the A34 road, and is located approximately 6 miles (9.7 km) north of Newbury.

== History ==
Beedon is listed in the Domesday Book of 1086 as a property of Abingdon Abbey, with Walter de Rivers as the tenant. It passed by inheritance to the de Lisle and later the Roos family. After the manor reverted to the Crown, it was awarded to the Reade family in 1615. In 1857 Sir John Chandos Reade sold the manor to Lewis Loyd, whose son Samuel became Baron Overstone. The manor was then inherited by Overstone's daughter, Harriet Loyd-Lindsay, Baroness Wantage.

== Natural conservation areas ==
Ashridge Wood, just to the north-east of the village, is a Site of Special Scientific Interest.

== Demography ==
2011 Published Statistics: Population, home ownership and extracts from Physical Environment, surveyed in 2005
| Output area | Homes owned outright | Owned with a loan | Socially rented | Privately rented | Other | km^{2} roads | km^{2} water | km^{2} domestic gardens | Usual residents | km^{2} |
|---|---|---|---|---|---|---|---|---|---|---|
| Civil parish | 51 | 47 | 48 | 33 | 4 | 0.07 | 0.0007 | 0.1 | 459 | 8.05 |

== Amenities ==
=== Transport ===
Beedon is served by Newbury and District bus services 6 and 6A from Newbury.

== Notable buildings ==
Beedon manor house was built in 1553 but mostly dates from the early in the 18th century. Now listed as Manor Farm house, it is a Grade II listed building.

The Church of England parish church of Saint Nicholas is a Grade I listed building built in about 1220.

Beedon Hill House, on the old A34, dates back to the 18th century. It is a Grade II listed building.

== See also ==
- List of civil parishes in Berkshire
