= Wokingham Rural District =

Historical rural district

Coordinates: 51.410°N 0.834°W

Wokingham
- History
  - Created: 1894
  - Abolished: 1974
  - Succeeded by: Borough of Wokingham
- Status: Rural district
  - HQ: Wokingham
- Map of boundary as of 1971

Wokingham Rural District was a rural district in the county of Berkshire, England. It was created in 1894. It was named after and administered from Wokingham, though this was a separate municipal borough.

Since 1 April 1974 it has formed part of the Borough of Wokingham.

== Civil parishes ==
At the time of its dissolution Wokingham RD consisted of the following 17 civil parishes:

- Arborfield
- Barkham
- Charvil
- Earley
- Finchampstead
- Newland
- Remenham
- Ruscombe
- Shinfield
- Sonning
- St Nicholas Hurst
- Swallowfield
- Twyford
- Wargrave
- Winnersh
- Wokingham Without
- Woodley and Sandford
