= Newbury Town Hall =

Municipal building in Newbury, Berkshire, England

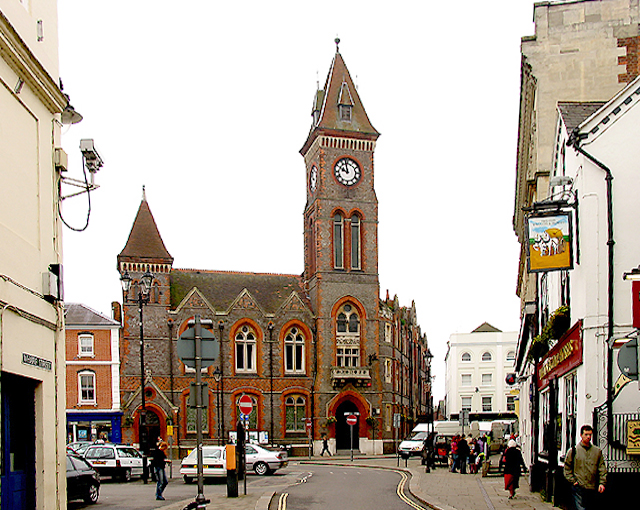
- Newbury Town Hall

- Shown in Berkshire
- 51.4012°N 1.3239°W
- Location: Newbury, Berkshire

History
- Built: 1881

Site notes
- Architect: James H. Money
- Architectural style: Gothic style

Listed Building – Grade II
- Official name: Town Hall and Municipal Buildings
- Designated: 14 May 1982
- Reference no.: 1210586

Newbury Town Hall is a municipal building in the Market Place in Newbury, Berkshire, England. The building, which is the meeting place of Newbury Town Council, is a Grade II listed building.

== History ==
The site for the first town hall in Newbury had been occupied by several properties belonging to a Mr Thomas Stockwell. Originally referred to as the "town house", it was designed by John Wood of Bath and constructed in the Market Place by a local building firm, Clarkes, and completed in 1742. The building was arcaded on the ground floor so markets could be held and there was a room known as the "great hall" on the first floor. Subsequent acquisitions for use in the great hall included two chandeliers, financed by a donation, in 1770 and two paintings by the Italian artist, Cosino Fioravante, in 1776.

In 1825, the UK Parliament passed the Newbury and Speenhamland Improvement Act, which, among other matters, contemplated a new town hall to replace "the ancient building then standing in the Market Place". The foundation stone for the new "municipal buildings" was laid by the mayor, William George Adey, on 30 August 1876. The structure was designed by James H. Money in the Gothic style and officially opened by the Earl of Carnarvon on 7 May 1878. The new municipal buildings were enhanced by the erection of a clock tower, which was financed by a public subscription campaign organised by the mayor, James Benjamin Stone, and completed in 1881. The Cambridge-chiming clock was designed and manufactured by Potts of Leeds.

The design involved an asymmetrical main frontage with five bays facing onto the Market Square; the central section of three bays, which were gabled, featured two-light arched windows on the first floor. The left hand bay featured a tower and the right hand bay featured a doorway on the ground floor with a balcony and a tall four-stage clock tower above. Internally, the principal room was the council chamber at the front of the building on the first floor.

The original town house was demolished in 1908 to make way for an extension to the rear, in a similar style to the municipal buildings, which was completed in 1910. During the First World War the town hall acted a recruiting base for potential soldiers for Kitchener's Army. It continued to serve as the headquarters of the municipal borough of Newbury for much of the 20th century and remained the local seat of government when the enlarged Newbury District Council was formed in 1974. However, it ceased to be the local civic meeting place when the district council moved to the Council Offices in Market street in 1980.

A plaque was installed on the town hall to commemorate the visit by Queen Elizabeth II, to celebrate the 400th anniversary of the granting of a Royal Charter, on 25 October 1996. The building then became the home of Newbury Town Council when it was formed in 1997.

Works of art in the town hall included portraits by Allan Ramsay of King George III and of Queen Charlotte.
