= Hungerford Rural District =

History of Berkshire

Coordinates: 51.4131°N 1.5114°W

- Rural district
- Population
  - 1901: 8,468
  - 1971: 10,615
- History
  - Created: 28 December 1894
  - Abolished: 31 March 1974
  - Succeeded by: Newbury
  - HQ: Hungerford
- Contained within
  - County Council: Berkshire
- Map of boundary as of 1971

Hungerford Rural District was a rural district in Berkshire, England from 1894 to 1974, covering an area in the south-west of the county.

== Evolution ==
The district had its origins in the Hungerford Rural Sanitary District. This had been created under the Public Health Act 1872, giving public health and local government responsibilities for rural areas to the existing boards of guardians of poor law unions. The Hungerford Rural Sanitary District covered the area of the Hungerford Poor Law Union, which had been established in 1835 and straddled the counties of Berkshire, Hampshire, and Wiltshire. The poor law union and rural sanitary district were administered from Hungerford Union Workhouse, which had been built in 1847 on Park Street in Hungerford.

Under the Local Government Act 1894, rural sanitary districts became rural districts from 28 December 1894. The act also directed that rural districts should not straddle county boundaries, and parishes should not straddle district (and therefore county) boundaries. It was decided in October 1894 that the single Hampshire parish in the rural sanitary district, Combe, should be transferred to Berkshire, whilst the three parishes which straddled Berkshire and Wiltshire (Hungerford, Chilton Foliat, and Shalbourne) were each placed in a single county, with the Wiltshire parts of Hungerford parish transferred to Berkshire, the Berkshire part of Shalbourne transferred to Wiltshire, and the Berkshire part of Chilton Foliat being added to Hungerford parish. Subject to these adjustments, the Berkshire parishes of the old rural sanitary district became the Hungerford Rural District, whilst the Wiltshire parishes became the Ramsbury Rural District. These boundaries were used to define the new rural district from its creation on 28 December 1894, but the process of formally adjusting the county boundaries to match took a little longer, so for the first few months of its existence Hungerford Rural District straddled Berkshire, Hampshire, and Wiltshire, but by October 1895 it was entirely in Berkshire. The link with the poor law union continued, with all the elected councillors of the Hungerford and Ramsbury rural districts together comprising the board of guardians for the Hungerford Poor Law Union, which renamed itself the Hungerford and Ramsbury Poor Law Union in 1896.

== Parishes ==
Hungerford Rural District contained the following civil parishes:

Parish	From	To	Notes
Avington	28 Dec 1894	31 Mar 1934	Parish abolished and area absorbed into Kintbury parish on 1 April 1934.
Combe	28 Dec 1894	31 Mar 1974	Parish initially in Hampshire, being added to Berkshire during 1895. (Note: Sources conflict on the exact date of Combe's transfer. Kelly's Directory of 1899 says 3 April, UKBMD says 30 September, and it appears to have been transferred under the same order which transferred the Charnham Street area of Hungerford, which contemporary press reports record as having taken effect on 1 October.)
East Garston	28 Dec 1894	31 Mar 1974	
East Shefford	28 Dec 1894	31 Mar 1974	Parish abolished same time Hungerford Rural District was abolished, merging with West Shefford to become parish of Great Shefford on 1 April 1974.
Hungerford	28 Dec 1894	31 Mar 1974	Parish initially straddled Berkshire and Wiltshire; larger part in Berkshire but Charnham Street area in Wiltshire. Wiltshire part added to Berkshire on 1 October 1895.
Inkpen	28 Dec 1894	31 Mar 1974	
Kintbury	28 Dec 1894	31 Mar 1974	Absorbed former parish of Avington in 1934.
Lambourn	28 Dec 1894	31 Mar 1974	
West Shefford	28 Dec 1894	31 Mar 1974	Parish abolished same time Hungerford Rural District was abolished, merging with West Shefford to become parish of Great Shefford on 1 April 1974.
West Woodhay	28 Dec 1894	31 Mar 1974	

== Premises ==
Hungerford Rural District Council held its first meeting at the workhouse in Hungerford on 2 January 1895, when Henry Deacon Woodman was appointed the first chairman. He had previously been the chairman of the board of guardians, and was also re-elected to that post on the same day. The council was based at the workhouse on Park Street in Hungerford until 1933, when it moved to Faringdon House at 128 High Street, Hungerford. In 1953 the council moved to The Priory, a large Victorian house on the south-eastern outskirts of Hungerford, where it remained until its abolition in 1974.

== Abolition ==
Hungerford Rural District was abolished under the Local Government Act 1972, becoming part of the new district of Newbury on 1 April 1974, which in turn became West Berkshire in 1998. The Hungerford Rural District Council's former offices at The Priory were converted into flats shortly after the council's abolition, before being completely redeveloped in 2011, with Redwood House being built on the site.
