= West Berkshire =

Unitary area in the county of Berkshire, England

- Unitary authority area
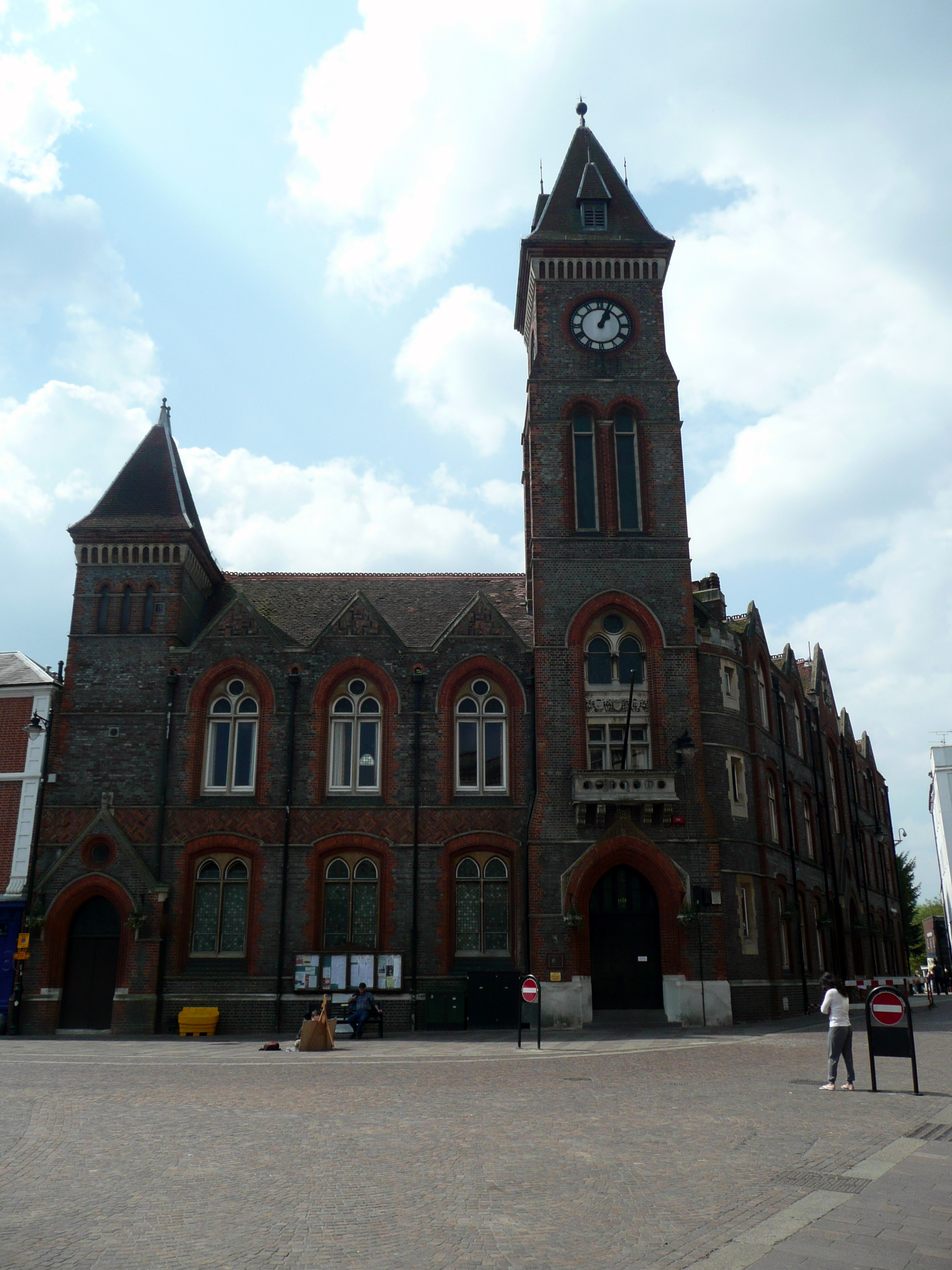
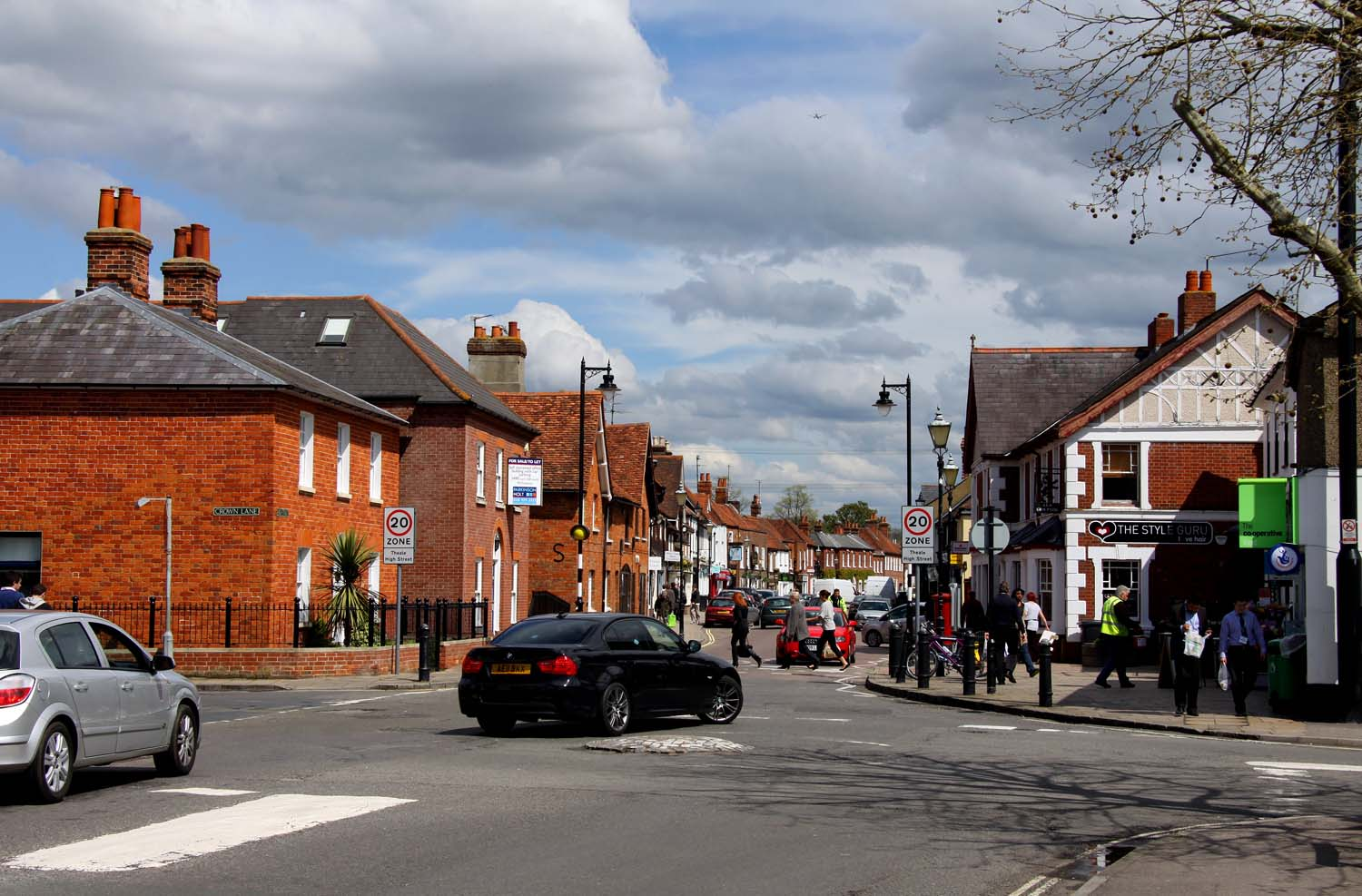
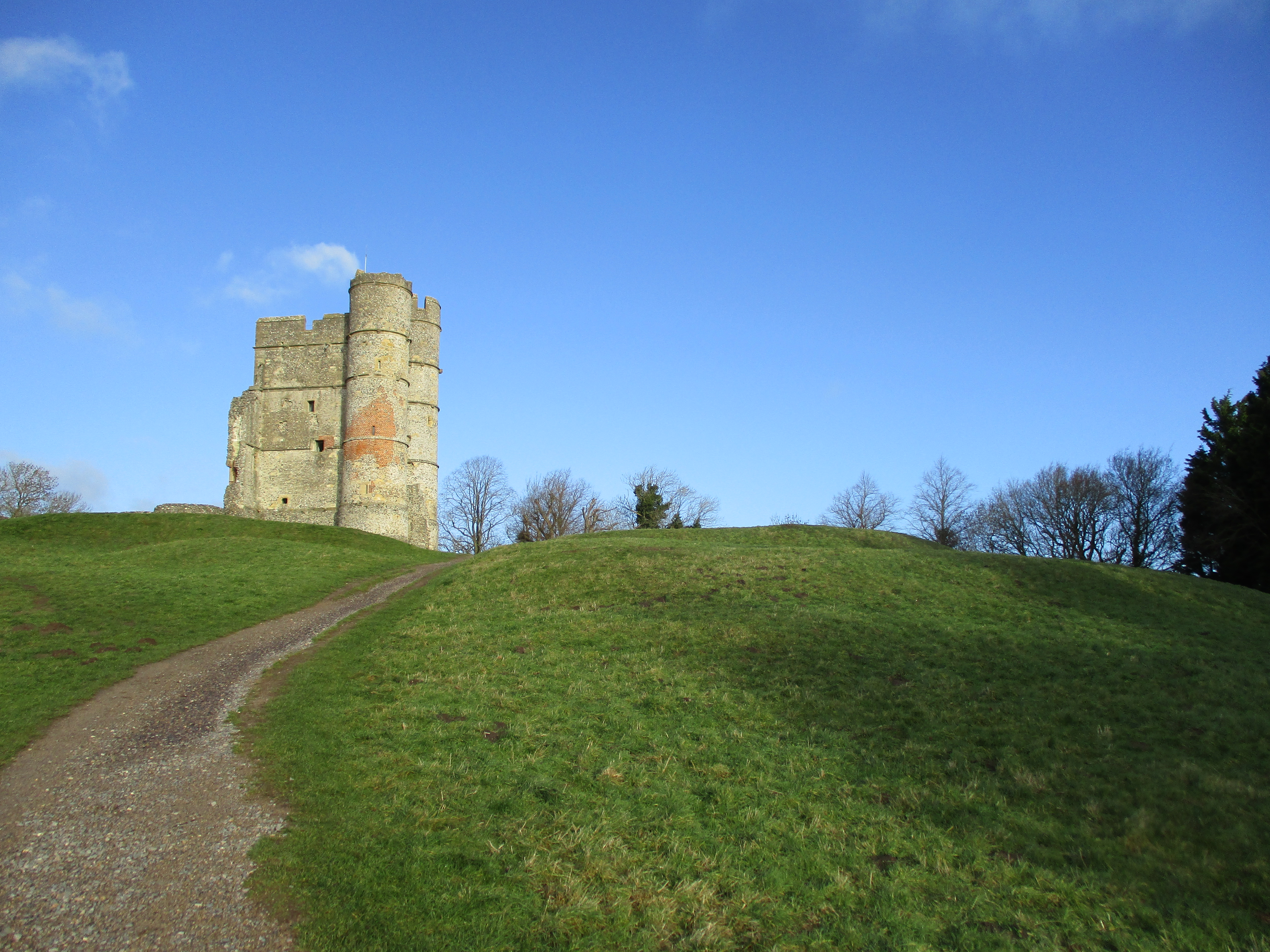
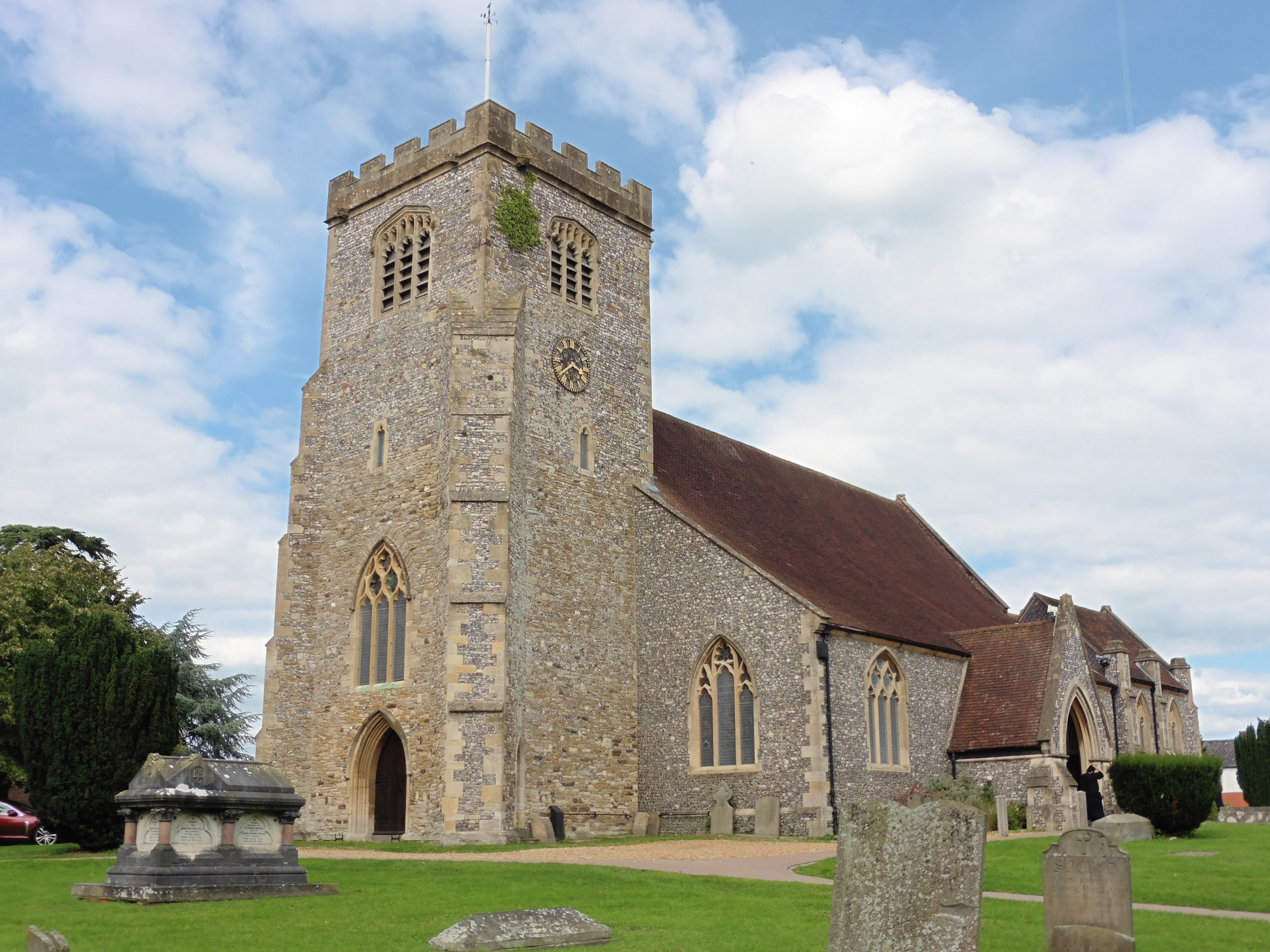
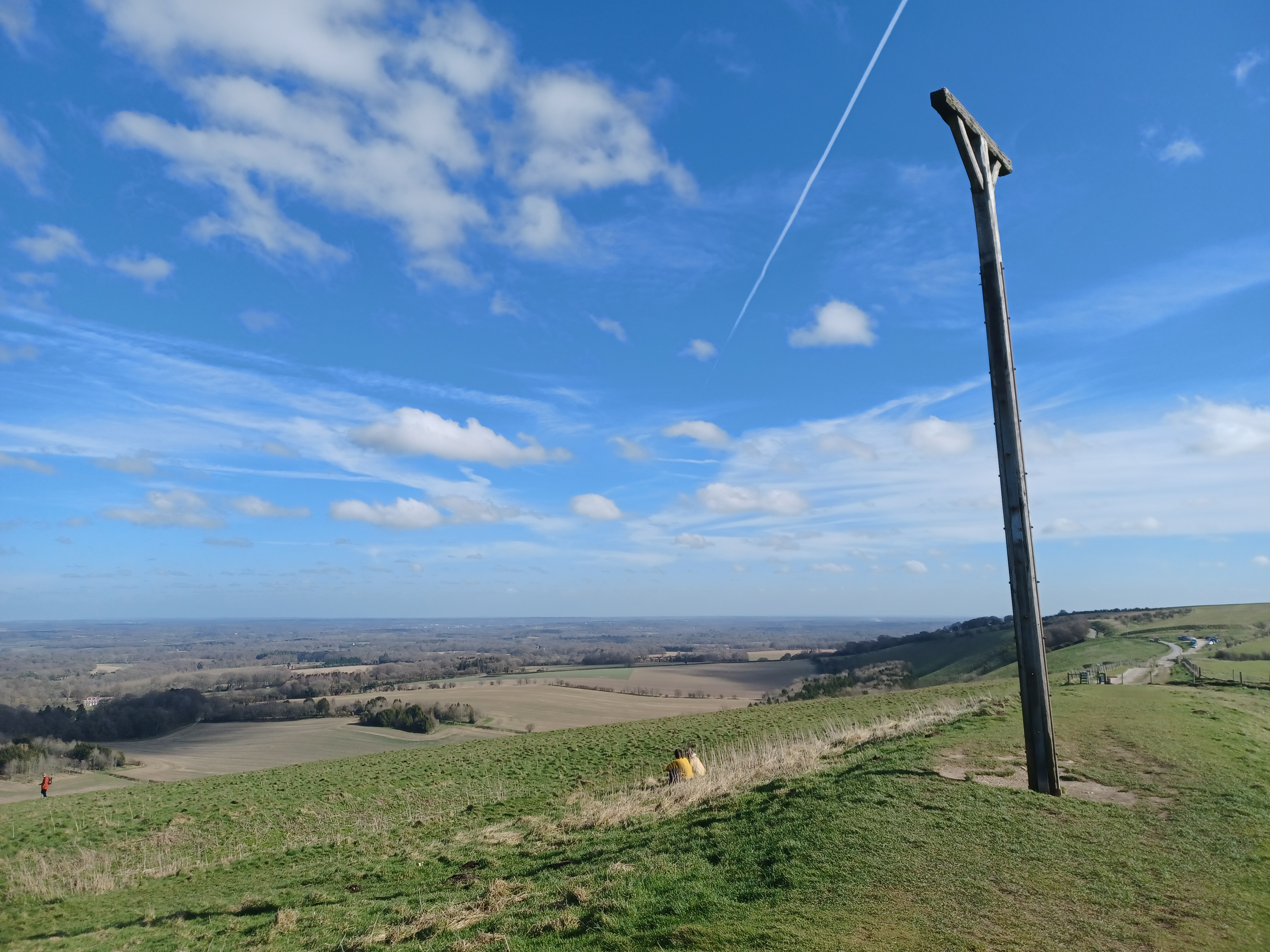
- From left to right; Top: Newbury Town Hall; Middle: Theale High Street and Donnington Castle; Bottom: St Mary's Church, Thatcham and Combe Gibbet near Gallows Down

- Shown within Berkshire
- Coordinates: 51°24′03″N 1°19′25″W
- Sovereign state: United Kingdom
- Constituent country: England
- Region: South East England
- Ceremonial county: Berkshire
- Status: Unitary authority
- Incorporated: 1 April 1974
- Admin HQ: Newbury

Government
  - Type: Unitary authority
  - Body: West Berkshire Council
  - Leadership: Leader & Cabinet (Liberal Democrat)
  - MPs: Lee Dillon; Olivia Bailey

Area
  - Total: 271.88 sq mi (704.17 km^{2})
  - Rank: 47th (of 296)

Population (2025)
  - Total: 165,523
  - Rank: 130th (of 296)
  - Density: 608.81/sq mi (235.06/km^{2})

Ethnicity (2021)
  - Ethnic groups: List: 91.9% White; 3.7% Asian; 2.4% Mixed; 1.3% Black; 0.7% other

Religion (2021)
  - Religion: List: 49.1% Christianity; 41.1% no religion; 8.5% other; 1.3% Islam
- Time zone: UTC0 (GMT)
  - Summer (DST): UTC+1 (BST)
- ISO 3166 code: GB-WBK
- ONS code: 00MB (ONS) E06000037 (GSS)
- OS grid reference: SU4705467146
- Website: www.westberks.gov.uk

West Berkshire is a unitary authority area in Berkshire, England. It comprises the part of the ceremonial county west of Reading. Its main settlements lie on the A4, including: Newbury, Hungerford, Thatcham and the westernmost suburbs of Reading. Other than the Borough of Reading, it borders the Borough of Wokingham, Basingstoke and Deane, Test Valley, Wiltshire, South Oxfordshire and Vale of White Horse.

Unlike most unitary authority areas in England, but in line with the others in Berkshire, West Berkshire is legally classed a non-metropolitan district but not a county in its own right. There is nonetheless no county council in Berkshire: the district is solely administered by West Berkshire Council in Newbury.

== History ==
=== Establishment ===
The district of Newbury was formed on 1 April 1974, as a merger of the borough of Newbury, Bradfield Rural District, Hungerford Rural District and Newbury Rural District, along with part of Wantage Rural District.

Until 1 April 1998, Newbury District Council and Berkshire County Council were responsible for the region at local government level. On 1 April 1998, Berkshire County Council was abolished and Newbury District Council changed its name to West Berkshire Council and took on the former County Council's responsibilities within its area.

=== Possible merger ===
In July 2026, the UK Government confirmed that West Berkshire would become part of a new unitary authority known as Ridgeway Council, as part of the wider reorganisation of local government in Oxfordshire and West Berkshire. The new authority would combine the existing areas of West Berkshire, South Oxfordshire and the Vale of White Horse, replacing the current councils. The proposal was selected over alternative reorganisation models following a government consultation.

Under the implementation timetable, West Berkshire Council would continue to operate until 1 April 2028, when it would be abolished and its functions transferred to Ridgeway Council. Elections to a shadow authority were scheduled for May 2027, with the shadow council overseeing the transition before the new authority formally assumed responsibility in April 2028.

However on 7 September 2026, the government announced that a number of ongoing local government reorganisations, including the one affecting West Berkshire, would be paused until the decision is "reviewed". Planned elections to the shadow authority will now not go ahead next year, with West Berkshire Council elections taking place instead. It is not clear if and when the proposed changes will go ahead.

== Geography ==
West Berkshire is semi-rural in character, with most of the population living in the wooded Kennet valley.

Natural England divides England into distinct National Character Areas based on landscape, biodiversity and cultural attributes. The northern part of West Berkshire falls within the Berkshire Downs (the Berkshire and Marlborough Downs NCA 116), while most of the southern part is classified as part of the Thames Basin Heaths (NCA 129). There are also relatively small areas of the Hampshire Downs (NCA 130), the Chiltern Hills (though none of the Chilterns National Landscape; NCA 110) and the Thames Valley (NCA 115). Around three-quarters of the land is designated North Wessex Downs National Landscape (or Area of Outstanding Natural Beauty).

Apart from Newbury, the other main centres in the district include Thatcham, Hungerford, Pangbourne and Lambourn. Larger villages include Burghfield, Mortimer and Hermitage. 30% of the population resides in the east of the district, these towns and villages including Tilehurst, Theale, Purley-on-Thames and Calcot which form part of the Reading/Wokingham Urban Area. West Berkshire borders Hampshire to the south, Wiltshire to the west, Oxfordshire to the north and both the Reading and Wokingham authorities to the east.

The highest point in southeast/south-central England is located in West Berkshire at Walbury Hill with a summit height of 297 m (974 ft) 2 km to the south of the village of Inkpen, though the hill is not particularly prominent.

West Berkshire has a number of water courses running through the area. In addition to the River Thames, there are the Rivers Lambourn, Kennet, Pang, Bourne and the Kennet and Avon Canal and a number of tributaries that feed these rivers. Properties within flood plains may be at risk of flooding from rising river waters or from water coming up through the ground in some periods of heavy and/or prolonged periods of rain. Purley and Pangbourne are particularly at risk.

== Economy ==
West Berkshire has the 21st largest economy in England, characterised by low unemployment, above average wages, and abundance of jobs in technology and financial sectors. The presence of Vodafone has created a cluster of around 80 mobile phone related businesses in Newbury, while the Lambourn area is the second most important centre for the racehorse industry in Great Britain, employing over 800 people directly, and producing an annual income of £20 million.

Other companies with operations in West Berkshire include Atomic Weapons Establishment (near Aldermaston), Bayer and PepsiCo.

== Coat of arms ==
The coat of arms for West Berkshire was established in 1974 for Newbury District Council. Upon the creation of the unitary authority it was inherited by West Berkshire Council.

The colours of red and gold in the arms represent industry and the richness of the area, whilst the interwoven cross represents the weaving industry which was important to Newbury in past centuries. The corn on the shield represents the agriculture industry which is important to the area, whilst the cogwheels represent manufacturing and manufacturing achievement. The mural crown represents local government and the grassy mount symbolises the downs of the surrounding area. Finally, the horseman represents the two battles of Newbury in the English Civil War.

== Politics ==
West Berkshire Council is the local authority for the area, based at the Council Offices on Market Street in Newbury.

The district is divided between the Newbury and Reading West and Mid Berkshire parliamentary constituencies, the latter also extending into parts of Reading Borough.

== Education ==
There are 10 state-funded secondary schools operating in West Berkshire as well as numerous primary schools and a special school provision. There are also a number of private schools.

Further and higher education in the area is provided by Newbury College, however there are no universities, the nearest being the University of Reading and one of the University of West London campuses, both in the neighbouring Reading Borough.

== Media ==
=== Television ===
The area is served by BBC South and ITV Meridian with television signals received from the Hannington TV transmitter.

=== Radio ===
Radio stations for the area are:

- BBC Radio Berkshire
- Heart South
- Greatest Hits Radio Berkshire & North Hampshire
- Kennet Radio (serving Newbury and Thatcham).

=== Newspapers ===
Local newspapers for the area is the Newbury Weekly News and Newbury & Thatcham Chronicle.

== Notable people ==
- Richard Adams (1920–2016), author
- Francis Baily (1774–1844), astronomer
- Michael Bond (1926–2017), author and creator of Paddington Bear
- David Cameron (born 1966), politician and UK Prime Minister
- Catherine, Princess of Wales (born 1982), member of the British royal family
- Terence Conran (born 1931), furniture designer
- Emma Crosby (born 1977), television newsreader
- Matthew Darby-Griffith (1772–1823), Napoleonic army general
- Miles Dempsey (1896–1969), WW2 army general
- James Hanson (1922–2004), industrialist
- Max Hastings (born 1945), journalist
- Nicky Henderson (born 1950), racehorse trainer
- John Newport Langley (1852–1925), scientist
- George Mann (1917–2001), English cricket team captain
- Melinda Messenger (born 1971), model and TV presenter
- Julian Pettifer (born 1935), TV journalist
- Chapman Pincher (1914–2014), journalist and author
- Jenny Pitman (born 1946), racehorse trainer and author
- Charles Portal, 1st Viscount Portal of Hungerford (1893–1971), WW2 air marshal
- Chris Tarrant (born 1946), TV presenter
- Jethro Tull (1674–1741), farmer and inventor
- Alfred Waterhouse (1830–1905), architect
- Theo Walcott (born 1989), footballer
- John Winchcombe aka Jack O'Newbury (1489–1557), industrialist
- Will Young (born 1979), pop singer
- Luke Humphries (born 1995), Professional dart player, PDC world champion
