= Eton Rural District =

Former local government area in the UK

Coordinates: 51.4881°N 0.6092°W

- Rural district
- Area
  - 1911: 41,005 acres (165.9 km^{2})
  - 1961: 35,537 acres (143.8 km^{2})
- Population
  - 1901: 20,038
  - 1971: 68,045
- History
  - Created: 28 December 1894
  - Abolished: 31 March 1974
  - Succeeded by: Beaconsfield
  - HQ: Slough

Eton Rural District was a rural district in the administrative county of Buckinghamshire, England, covering an area in the south-east of the county. It was named after but did not contain Eton, which was an urban district.

== History ==
The district had its origins in the Eton Poor Law Union, which had been created in 1835, covering Eton itself and several surrounding parishes. Despite being named after Eton, the board of guardians chose to build the workhouse for the union in Slough, with the building being completed in 1836 on Upton Lane (later renamed Albert Street). In 1872 sanitary districts were established, giving public health and local government responsibilities for rural areas to the existing boards of guardians of poor law unions. The Eton Rural Sanitary District therefore covered the area of the poor law union except for Eton itself and Slough, which both had local boards of health and so formed their own urban sanitary districts. The Eton Rural Sanitary District was administered from Eton Union Workhouse on Albert Street, Slough.

Under the Local Government Act 1894, rural sanitary districts became rural districts from 28 December 1894. The Eton Rural District Council held its first meeting on 8 January 1895 at the workhouse in Slough. George Shippen Willes was appointed the first chairman of the council.

== Parishes ==
It included the parishes of:

- Boveney (abolished 1934, rural part to Dorney, urban part to Eton)
- Burnham
- Datchet
- Denham
- Dorney
- Eton Wick (created December 1894 from the parts of Eton parish outside the Eton Urban District, abolished 1934 and absorbed back into Eton)
- Farnham Royal
- Fulmer
- Gerrards Cross (created 1895)
- Hedgerley
- Hedgerley Dean (abolished 1934, split between Farnham Royal, Gerrards Cross, Hedgerley)
- Hitcham (abolished 1934, split between Burnham, Dorney and Taplow)
- Horton
- Iver
- Langley Marish (part to Slough in 1930, remainder split between Fulmer and Wexham in 1934)
- Stoke Poges
- Taplow
- Upton cum Chalvey (abolished c. 1900, most to Slough)
- Wexham
- Wyrardisbury

== Premises ==
Until the Second World War, the council continued to meet at the Union Workhouse in Slough, which was later renamed the Albert House public assistance institution in 1930 and subsequently became Upton Hospital in 1948. Administrative functions were generally carried out at the offices of the solicitor who acted as clerk to the council. In 1928 the council purchased a large detached Victorian house called Denmark House on Windsor Road, Slough, at the corner with Chalvey Road. Denmark House was converted to become the council's main offices. At the same time, the firm of solicitors where the council's clerk was based moved to Apsley House, two doors along Windsor Road from Denmark House, and some council departments were based at Apsley House.

In 1954 the council extended Denmark House, building a linking section attaching it to the neighbouring house called Abbeyfield (in between Denmark House and Apsley House), which was incorporated into the offices. The extended Denmark House then became the council's combined offices and meeting place. Apsley House was subsequently demolished around 1970 to make way for a new police station and magistrates court.

== Abolition ==
The district was abolished on 1 April 1974. It was partitioned between Windsor and Maidenhead in Berkshire (Datchet, Horton and Wraysbury parishes) and Beaconsfield district in Buckinghamshire, with a small part of Burnham and Wexham parishes going to Slough. Beaconsfield District Council (which was renamed South Bucks District Council in 1980) used the former Eton Rural District Council's offices at Denmark House as its headquarters until 2004, when the council moved to Denham. Denmark House was then demolished to make way for a residential development called Aspects Court.

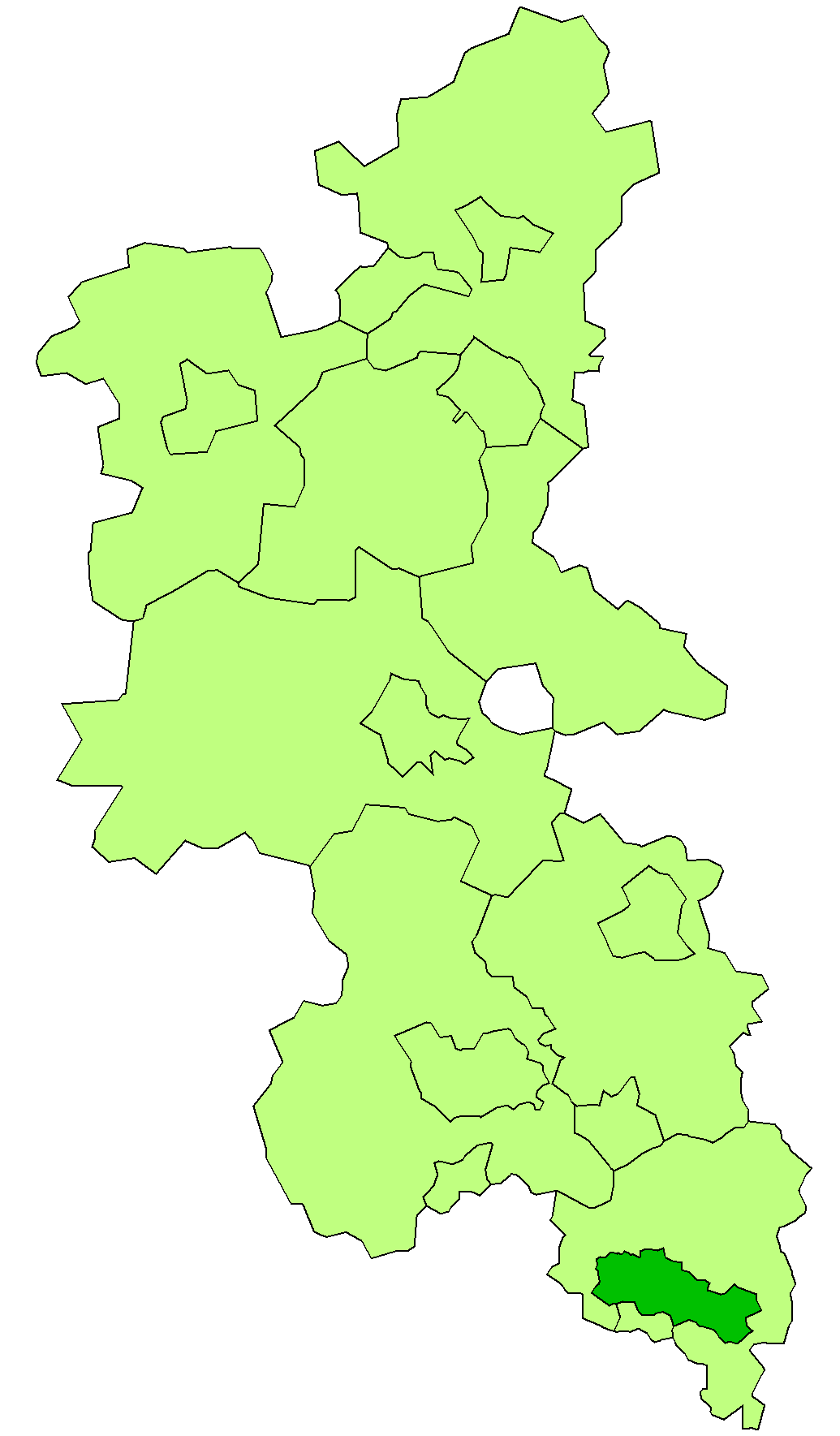
Eton RD is the entity above around Slough ( Slough is tinted dark green), but not the small borough directly below it, which is Eton UD.

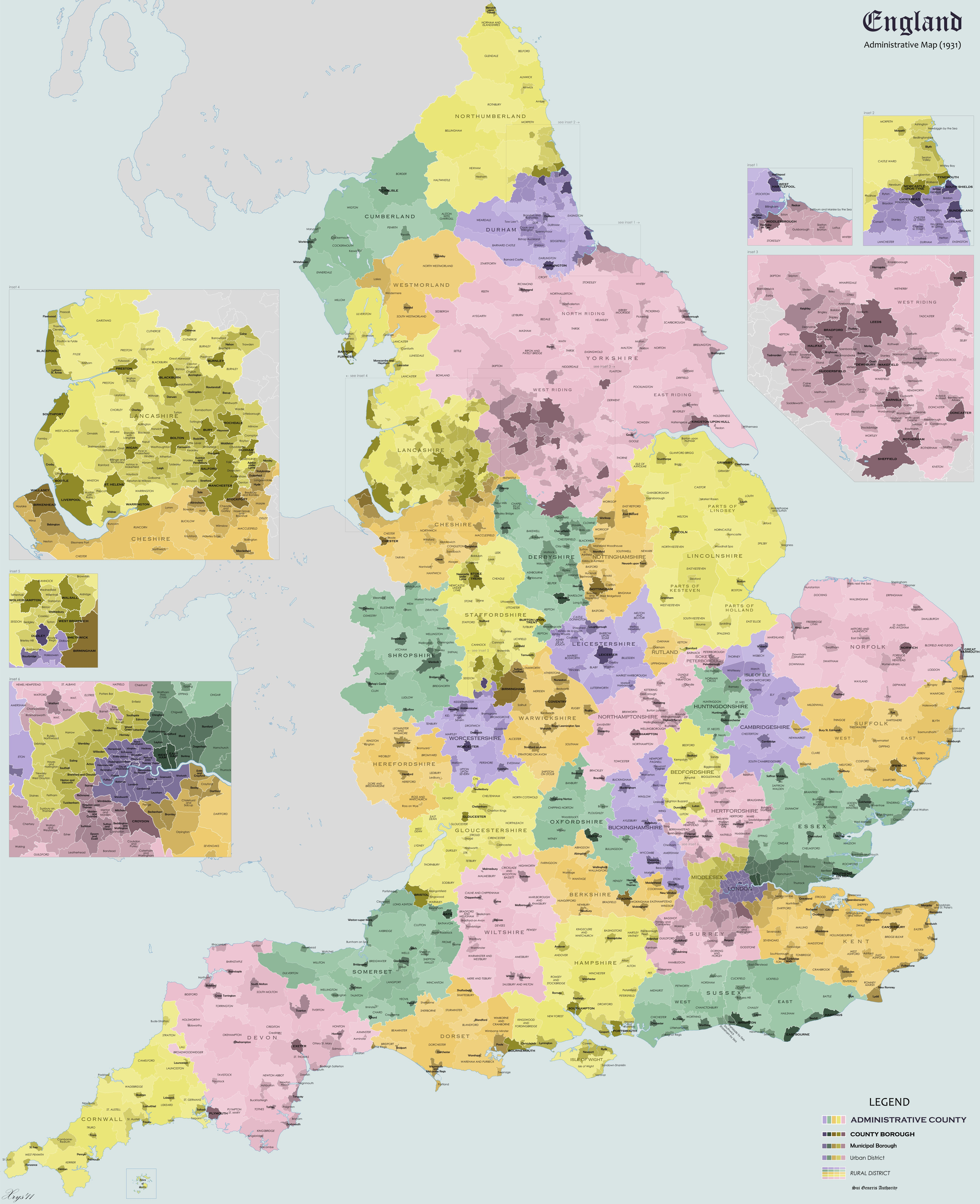
Administrative map of England in 1931.
