= Eton Urban District =

Former local government area in the UK

Coordinates: 51.4881°N 0.6092°W

Eton
- Local Board District (1849-1894); Urban District (1894-1974)
- Area
  - 1911: 299 acres (1.2 km^{2})
  - 1961: 993 acres (4.0 km^{2})
- Population
  - 1901: 3,301
  - 1971: 3,615
- History
  - Created: 6 October 1849 (Local Board District); 31 December 1894 (Urban District)
  - Abolished: 31 March 1974
  - Succeeded by: Windsor and Maidenhead
  - HQ: Eton

The town of Eton formed a local government district in Buckinghamshire, England, from 1849 to 1974. It was administered as a local board district from 1849 to 1894, and as an urban district from 1894 to 1974.

== History ==
Part of the parish of Eton was declared to be a local board district on 6 October 1849. The defined area of the local board was drawn relatively tightly around the built-up area of the town, essentially just covering the High Street area. Eton College and its playing fields were initially excluded from the local board district, as were the more rural parts of the parish of Eton. The Eton Local Board held its first meeting on 30 November 1849, when John Cleave was appointed the first chairman of the board.

An attempt to enlarge the local board district in 1851 so as to include Eton College was defeated by the college. A few years later another attempt to bring the college within the local board district was made, with an inquiry being held in December 1867. The college did not oppose the expansion of the district on that occasion, and so the district was enlarged in 1868 to include the college and its grounds.

Under the Local Government Act 1894, local board districts became urban districts with effect from 31 December 1894. The act also specified that parishes could not straddle urban and rural districts, and so the parts of the parish of Eton outside the local board district became a separate parish called Eton Wick, which was included in the Eton Rural District. Eton Urban District Council held its first meeting on 3 January 1895, when Edward Compton Austen-Leigh was appointed the first chairman of the council. He had been the last chairman of the local board.

In 1934 the parish of Eton Wick was abolished and absorbed into the parish and urban district of Eton. The parish of Boveney was abolished at the same time, with its former area being split between Eton and Dorney.

== Premises ==
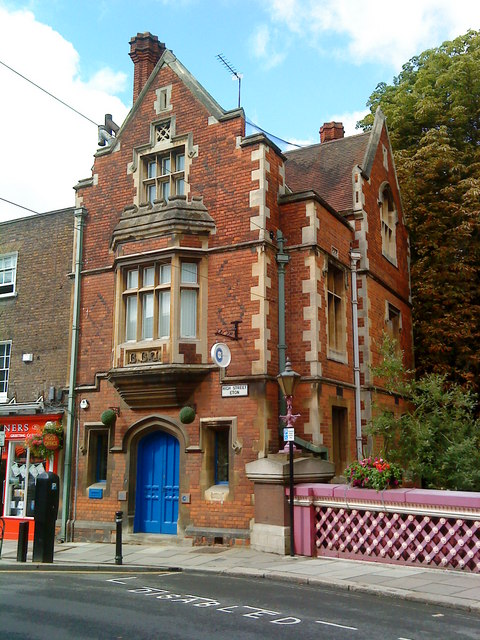
138 High Street: Council's offices 1890 – c. 1957

For its first forty years the Eton Local Board met at various rented rooms in the town. In 1890 a new building was erected at 138 High Street by the Baldwin's Bridge Trust, a charity with responsibility for maintaining the adjoining bridge over the stream called Barnes Pool. The building at 138 High Street was designed to serve both as offices for the trust itself and to provide offices and a council chamber for Eton Local Board. The board held its first meeting in the new building on 1 January 1891. The urban district council continued to be based at 138 High Street until the late 1950s, when it moved to 102 High Street, which had originally been built by the council in 1904 as the town's fire station.

== Abolition ==
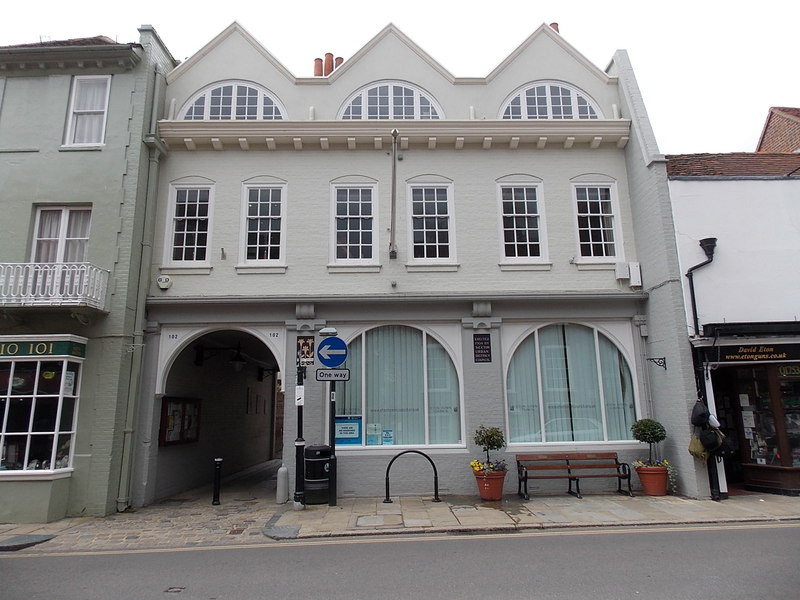
102 High Street: Council's offices after c. 1957

In 1974, under the Local Government Act 1972 Eton Urban District was disbanded and together with parts of Eton Rural District was transferred to Berkshire and combined with adjacent urban districts to form Windsor and Maidenhead District. A successor parish was created for the town, with its council taking the name Eton Town Council, which continues to be based at the urban district council's old offices at 102 High Street.

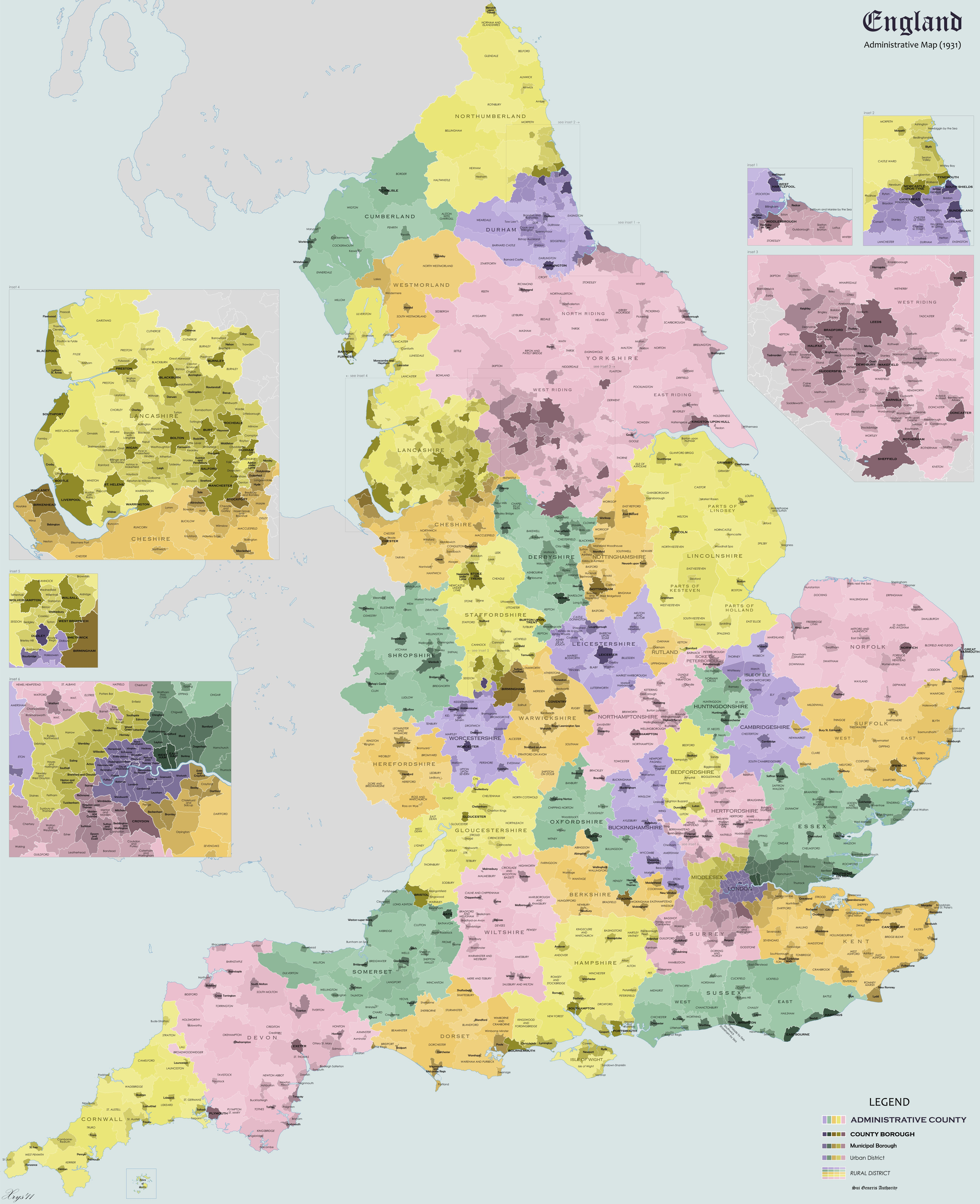
Administrative map of England in 1931
