= Boveney =

Village in Buckinghamshire, England

Coordinates: 51.490414°N 0.648069°W

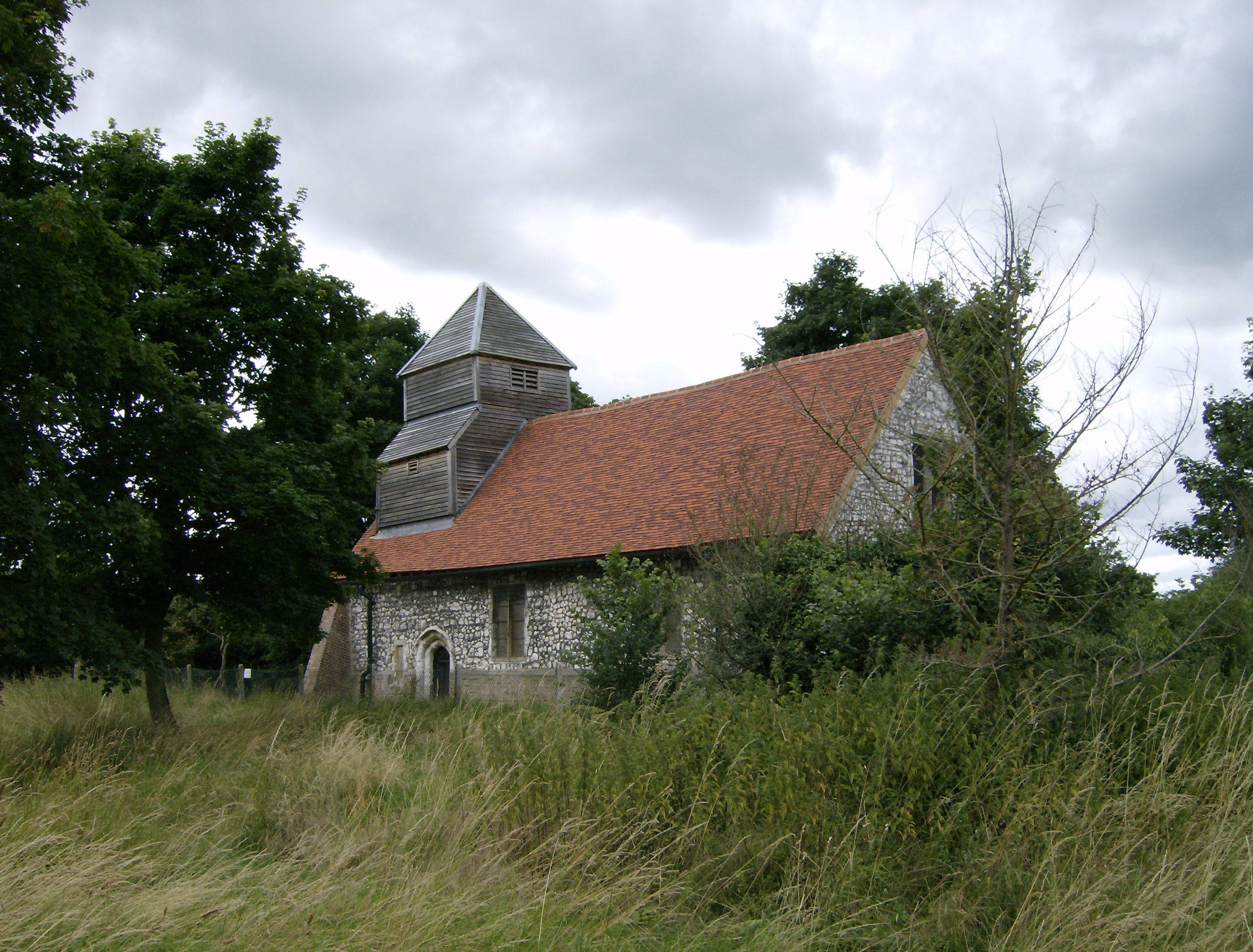
- St Mary Magdalene Church, Boveney

- Location within Buckinghamshire
- OS grid reference: SU938777
- Civil parish: Dorney
- Unitary authority: Buckinghamshire
- Ceremonial county: Buckinghamshire
- Region: South East
- Country: England
- Sovereign state: United Kingdom
- Post town: Windsor
- Postcode district: SL4
- Dialling code: 01753
- Police: Thames Valley
- Fire: Buckinghamshire
- Ambulance: South Central
- UK Parliament: Beaconsfield

Boveney is a village in the civil parish of Dorney, in Buckinghamshire, England. It is situated near Windsor, between the villages of Eton Wick in Berkshire, and Dorney and Dorney Reach in Buckinghamshire. Since boundary changes in 1974 and 1995, Boveney is now the southernmost village in Buckinghamshire.

== Origin of name ==
The village name is Anglo-Saxon in origin and means "above island". This refers to the island in the River Thames next to the village. The Anglo-Saxon name for the village was Bufanege.

== History ==
Boveney historically formed a chapelry of the ancient parish of Burnham. Parish functions under the poor laws from the 17th century onwards were administered separately for the chapelry of Boveney and the rest of Burnham parish. As such, Boveney became a separate civil parish in 1866 when the legal definition of 'parish' was changed to be the areas used for administering the poor laws. Boveney was part of Eton Rural District from 1894 to 1934.

The parish was abolished in 1934. The north-east of the old parish, which included part of the built up area of Eton Wick, was transferred to Eton Urban District. The remainder of the old parish was added to the parish of Dorney. At the 1931 census (the last before the abolition of the parish), Boveney had a population of 630.

The Church of St Mary Magdalene is in a remote part of the village by the River Thames. In 1983 the church was declared redundant and vested in the care of the Friends of Friendless Churches, who repair and conserve it for visitors and local people to enjoy. In 2004 a major campaign was undertaken to repair the 14th century timber-framed tower and a further programme of repairs was planned for 2007, so the church was closed to visitors.

Dorney Common, which borders the village, is one of several locations to view Windsor Castle from outside the town of Windsor itself; the large open space affords panoramic views of the castle as well as parts of Eton.

== In literature ==
The second stanza of "The Eton Boating Song" (first performed 1863) ends with the repeated lines:

Let us see how the wine-glass flushes,
At supper on Boveney meads

The village is twice briefly mentioned in Jerome K. Jerome's book Three Men in a Boat (1889).

== Filming location ==
Many TV and film companies use the village as a location.

The Church of St Mary Magdalene was used as a location for many Hammer Horror movies which were made at nearby Bray Studios. The Inspector Morse episode Silent World of Nicholas Quinn and the Kevin Costner movie Robin Hood: Prince of Thieves were partly filmed here. The signpost for the village appeared very briefly in the 1976 Sweeney episode "I Want the Man" as a white Mercedes Benz limousine turns left towards the village (06m 48secs standard Freemantle DVD).

== Gallery ==
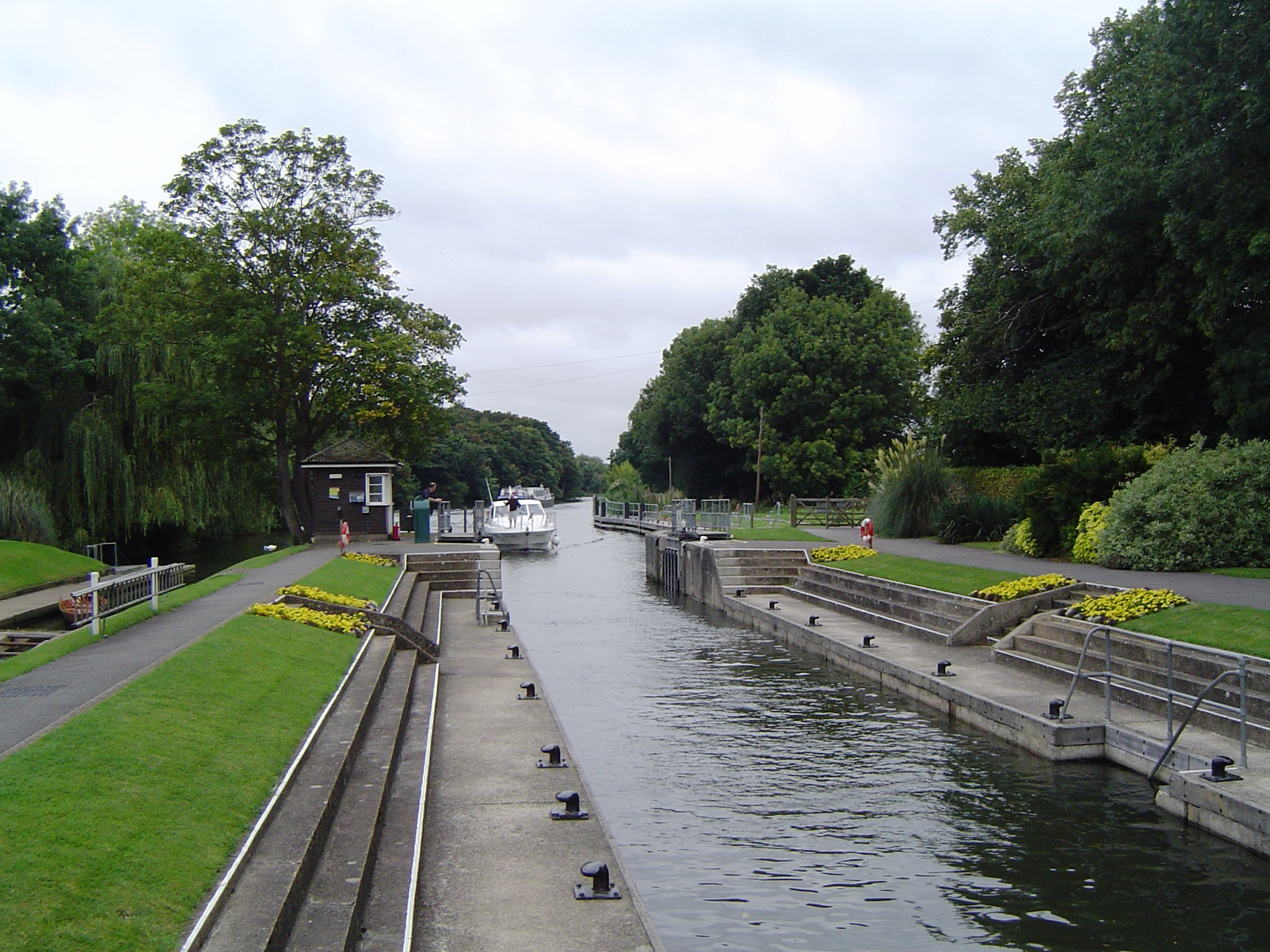
Boveney Lock

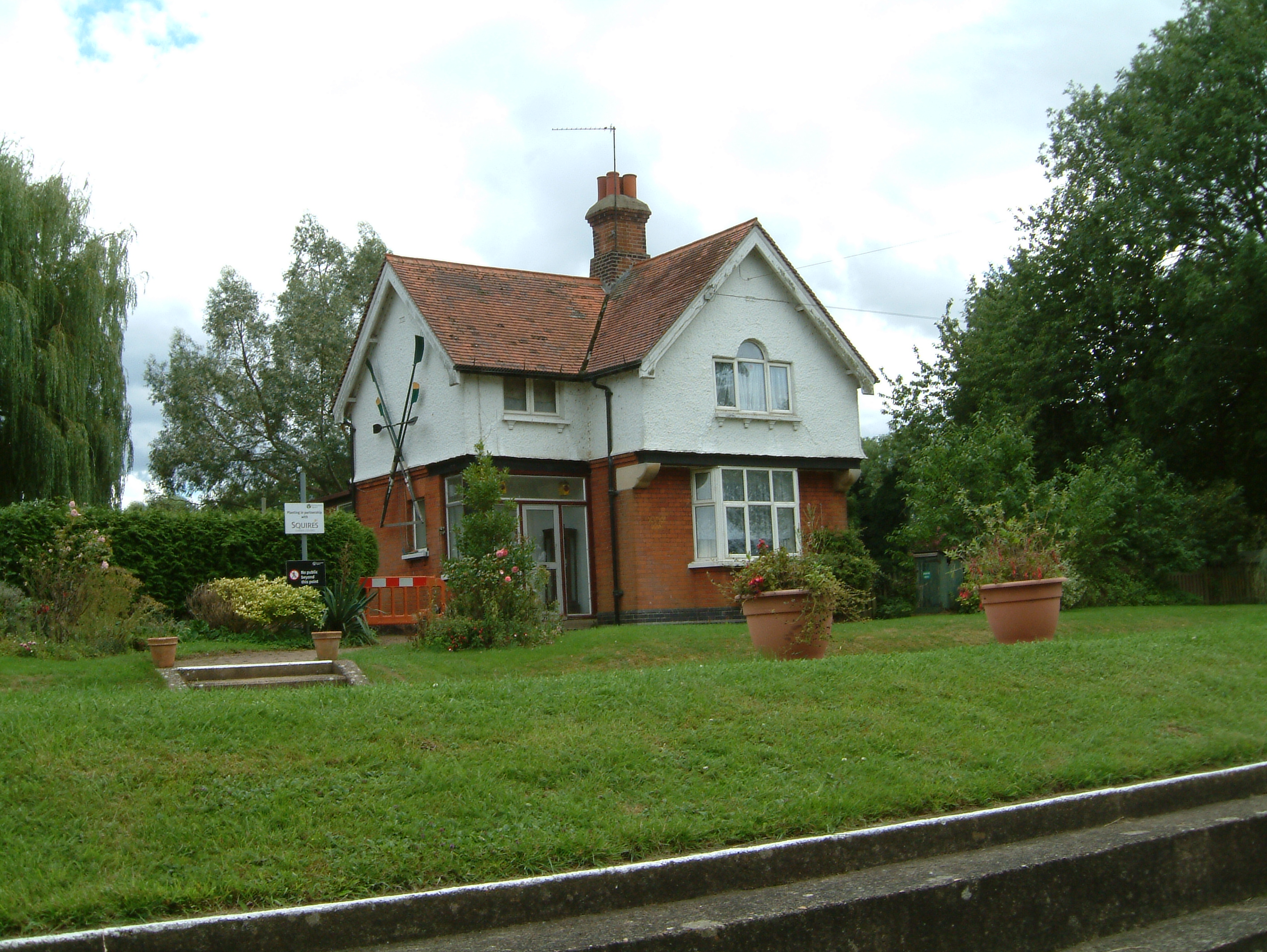
Lock Keeper's House

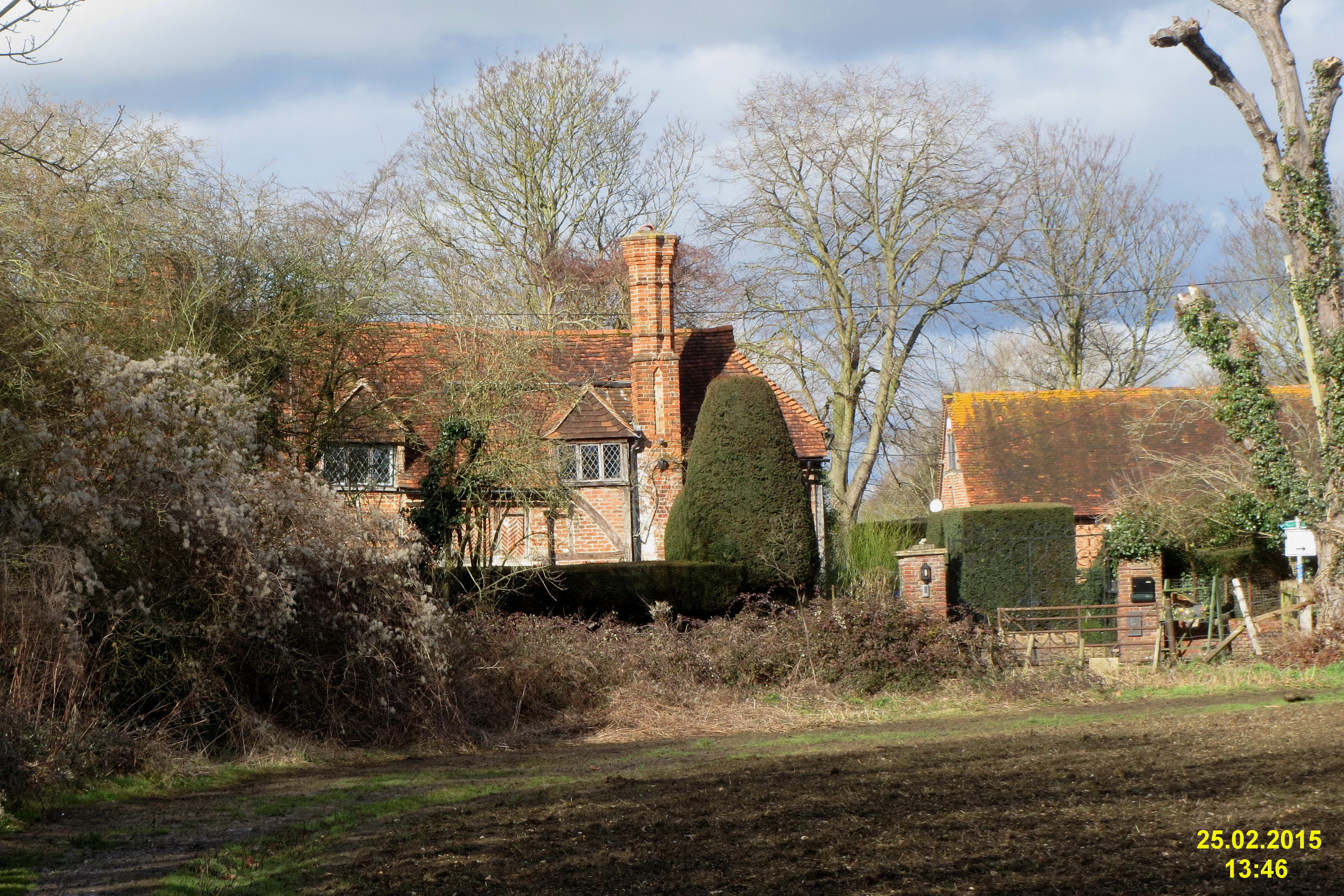
Houses in Boveney
