= Royal Borough of Windsor and Maidenhead =

Borough and unitary authority in Berkshire, England

- Royal borough, unitary authority area, borough
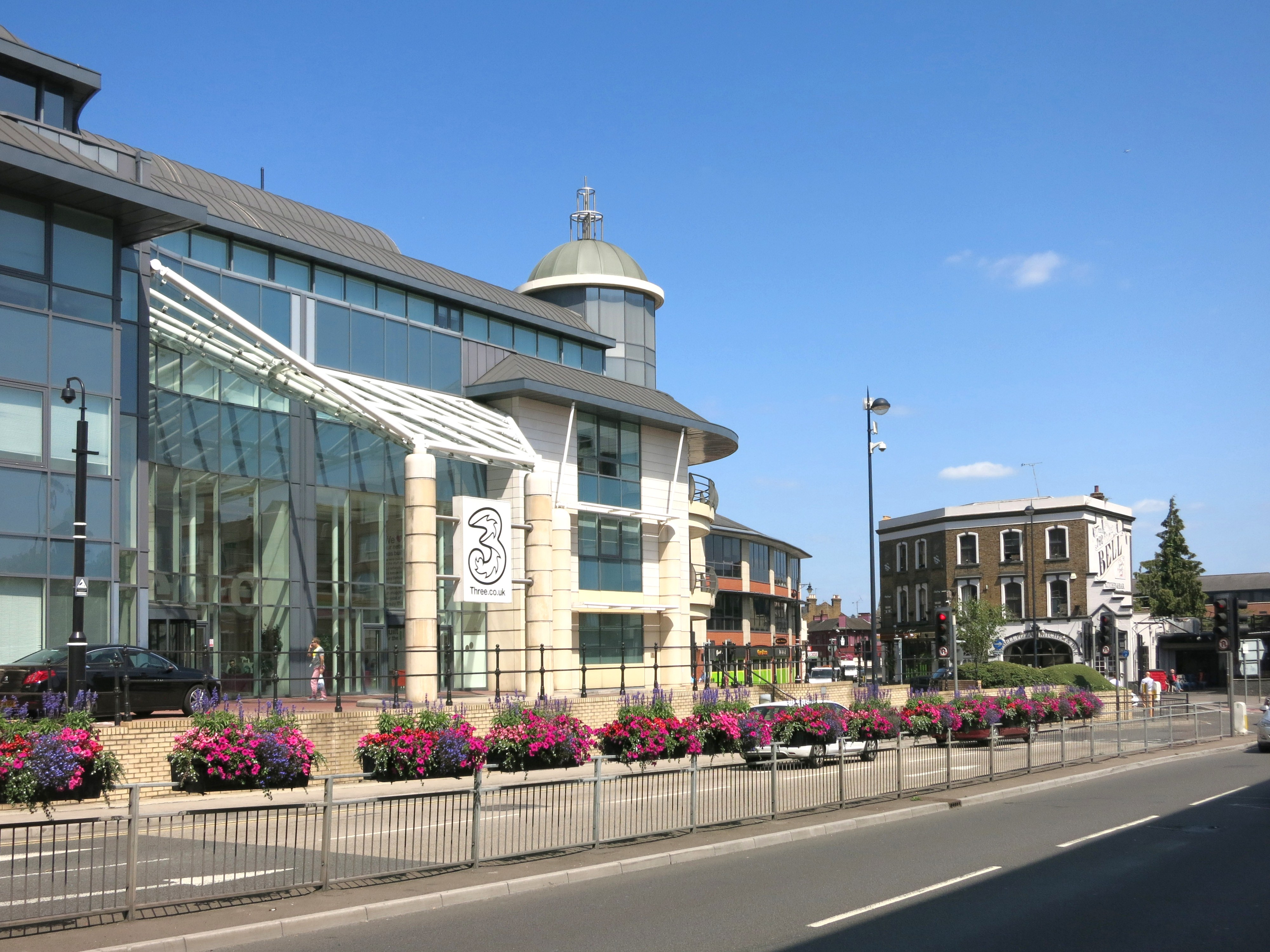
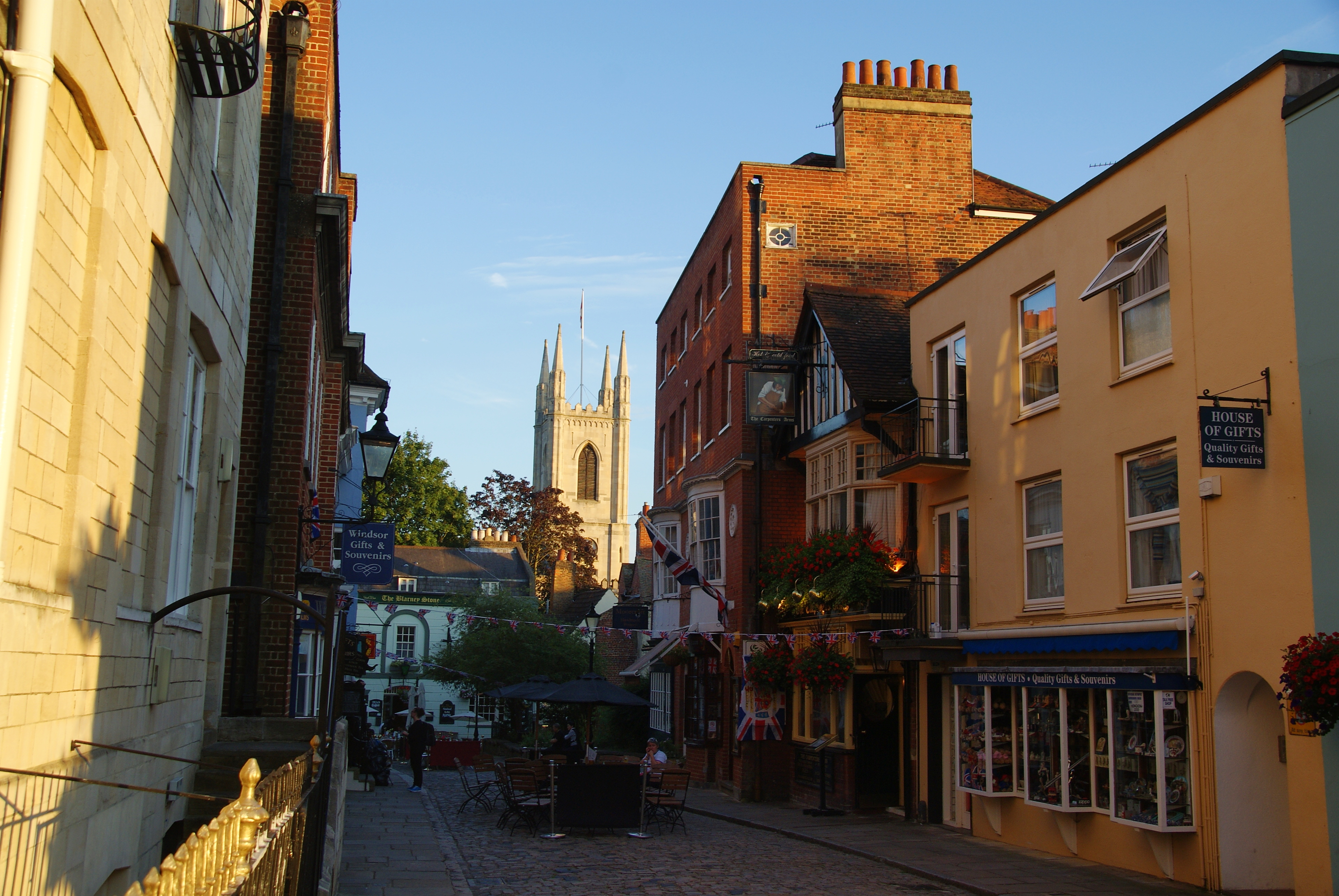
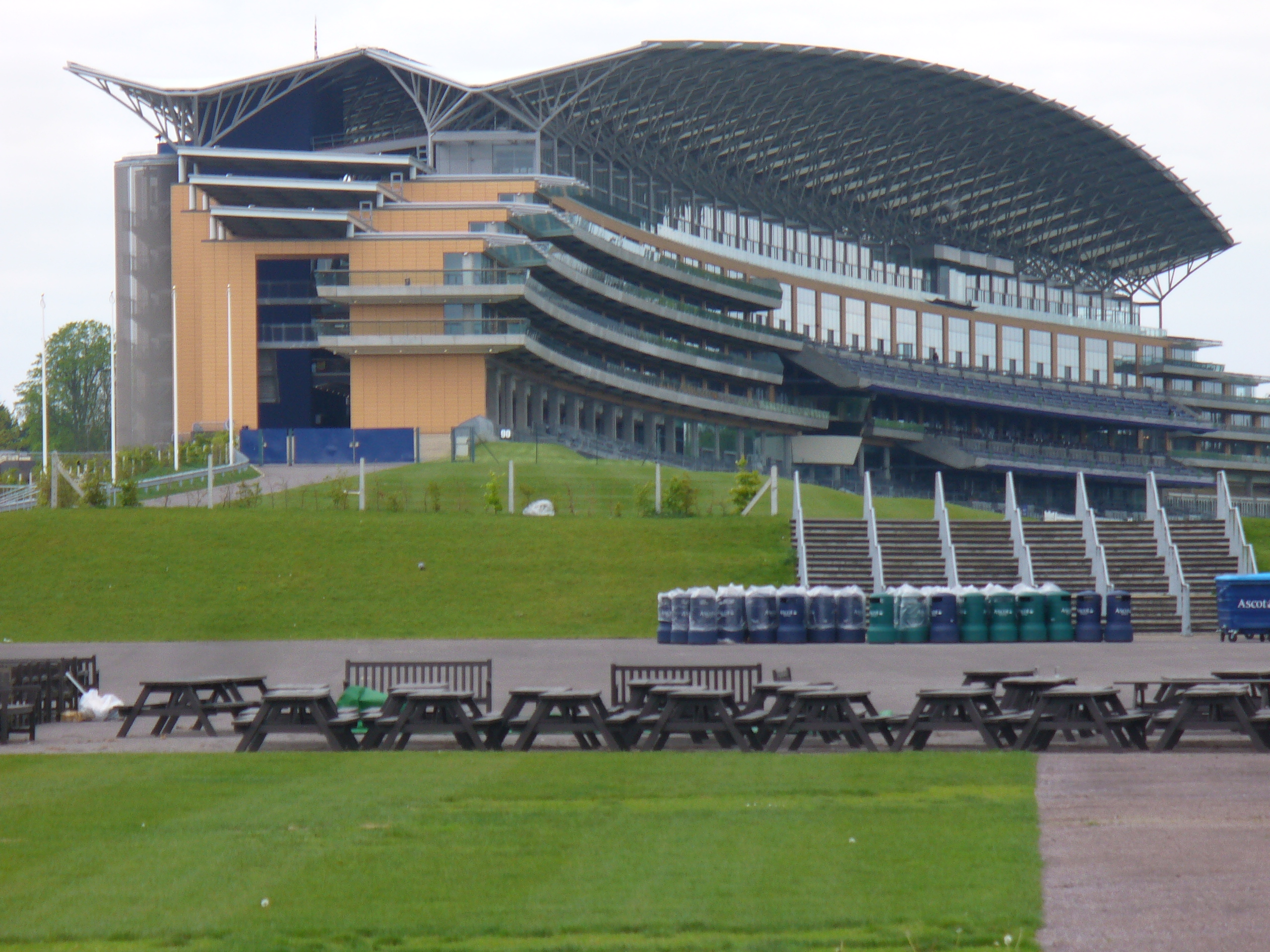
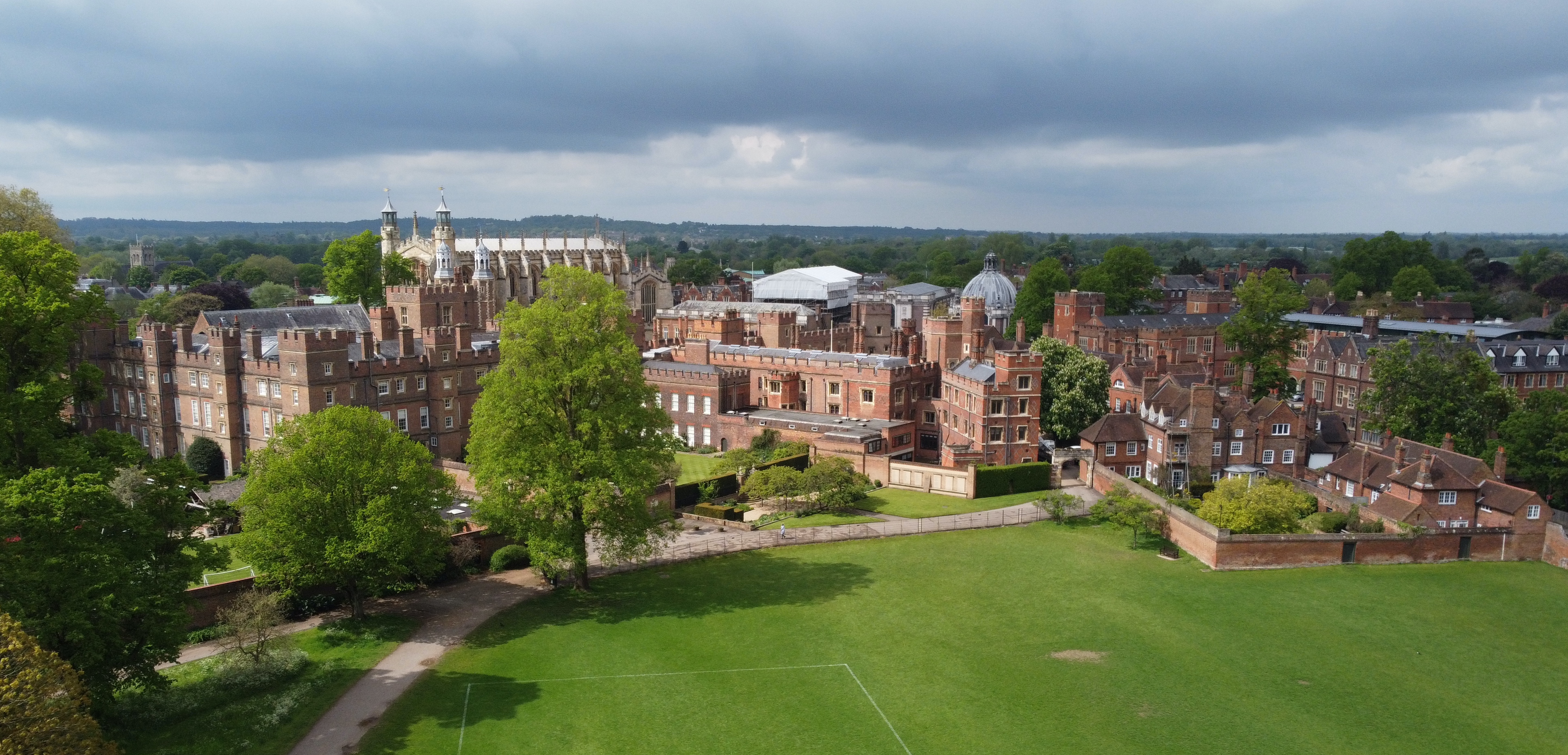
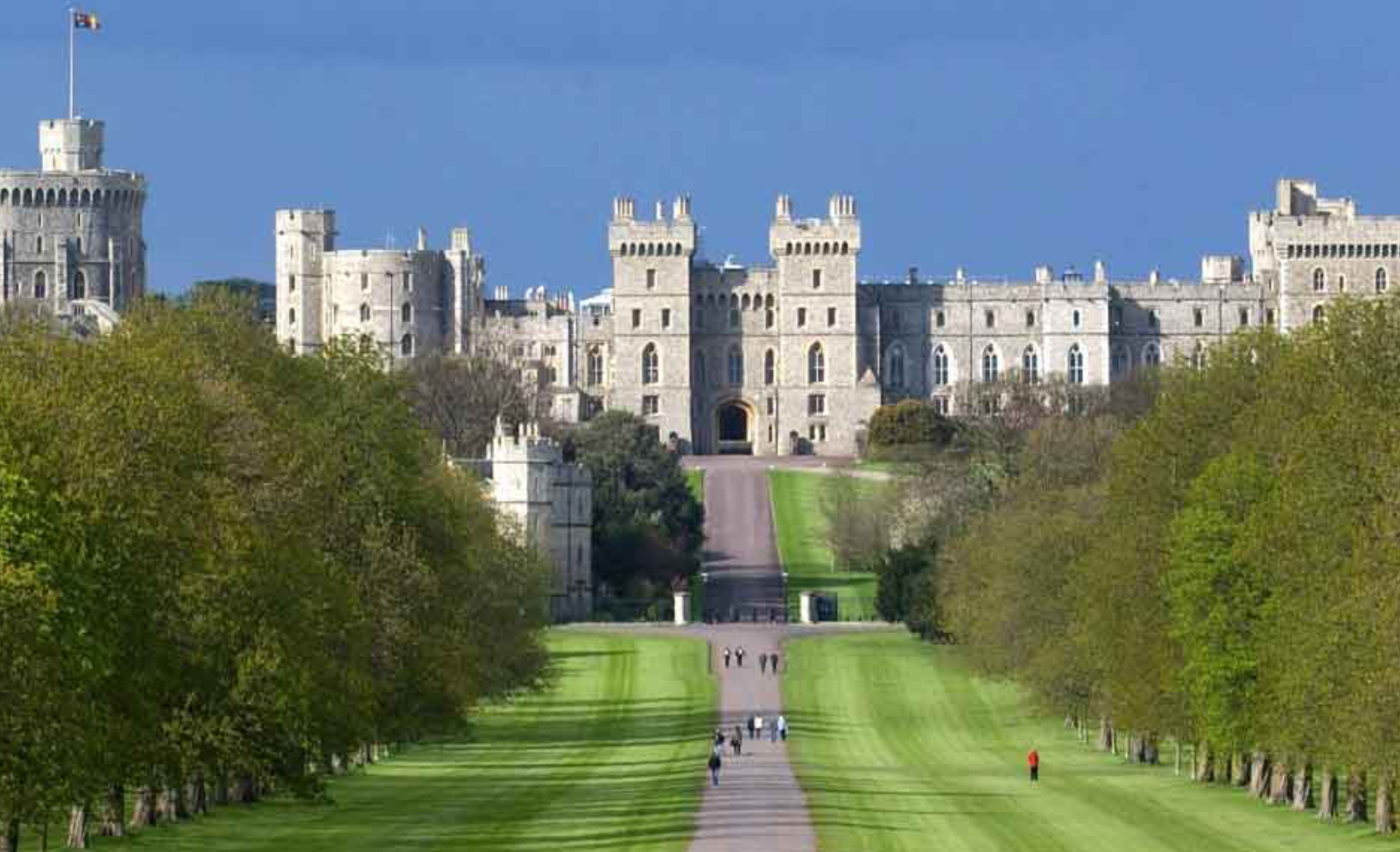
- From left to right; Top: Grenfell Road, Maidenhead; Middle: Church Street, Windsor and Ascot Racecourse Grand Stand; Bottom: Eton College and Windsor Castle

- Coat of arms

- Shown within Berkshire
- Coordinates: 51°28′00″N 0°40′00″W
- Sovereign state: United Kingdom
- Constituent country: England
- Region: South East England
- Ceremonial county: Berkshire
- Status: Unitary authority
- Incorporated: 1 April 1974
- Admin HQ: Maidenhead

Government
  - Type: Unitary authority
  - Body: Windsor and Maidenhead Borough Council
  - MPs: Jack Rankin (Windsor); Joshua Reynolds (Maidenhead)

Area
  - Total: 76.61 sq mi (198.43 km^{2})
  - Rank: 146th (of 296)

Population (2025)
  - Total: 159,776
  - Rank: 139th (of 296)
  - Density: 2,085.5/sq mi (805.20/km^{2})

Ethnicity (2021)
  - Ethnic groups: List: 79.8% White; 13.1% Asian; 3.4% Mixed; 2.1% other; 1.5% Black

Religion (2021)
  - Religion: List: 49.8% Christianity; 31% no religion; 13.6% other; 5.6% Islam
- Time zone: UTC0 (GMT)
  - Summer (DST): UTC+1 (BST)
- ISO 3166: GB-WNM
- ONS code: 00ME (ONS) E06000040 (GSS)
- OS grid reference: SU926750
- Website: www.rbwm.gov.uk

The Royal Borough of Windsor and Maidenhead is a unitary authority area with royal borough status in Berkshire, England. The borough is named after its two largest towns of Maidenhead (where the council is based) and Windsor. The borough also includes the towns of Ascot and Eton, plus numerous villages and surrounding rural areas. It is home to Windsor Castle, Eton College, Legoland Windsor and Ascot Racecourse. It is one of only four boroughs in England entitled to be prefixed royal, and the only one of them which is not a London borough.

== History ==
The non-metropolitan district of Windsor and Maidenhead was created in 1974 under the Local Government Act 1972, as one of six districts within Berkshire. It covered the whole area of five former districts and part of a sixth, which were all abolished at the same time:

- Cookham Rural District
- Eton Rural District (parishes of Datchet, Horton and Wraysbury only, rest split between Beaconsfield and Slough)
- Eton Urban District
- Maidenhead Municipal Borough
- New Windsor Municipal Borough
- Windsor Rural District

The two Eton districts had been in Buckinghamshire prior to the reforms. The new district was named 'Windsor and Maidenhead' after its two largest towns. The district was also given the additional honorific title of royal borough, which had previously been held by the municipal borough of New Windsor.

From 1974 until 1998 the council was a lower-tier authority, with Berkshire County Council providing county-level services. The county council was abolished in 1998 and the Royal Borough of Windsor and Maidenhead took on county-level services, making it a unitary authority. Berkshire continues to legally exist as a ceremonial county and a non-metropolitan county, albeit without a county council.

== Geography ==
=== Watercourses ===
The borough straddles the River Thames. Approximately half of its flow through the borough has a bypass and seasonally-variable flood relief channel, the Jubilee River. Further flood relief channels are planned for the reaches below the Borough to benefit many other settlements including Datchet and Wraysbury in the borough which were the settlements most widely affected by the UK storms of January-February 2014.

=== Settlements ===
The borough contains the following towns and villages:

- Ascot
- Bray
- Clewer
- Cookham
- Datchet
- Eton
- Eton Wick
- Horton
- Maidenhead
- North Ascot (part)
- Old Windsor
- South Ascot
- Sunningdale
- Sunninghill
- Waltham St. Lawrence
- White Waltham
- Windsor
- Wraysbury

== Governance ==
Since 1998, the council has been a unitary authority, providing both district-level and county-level functions. It is based at Maidenhead Town Hall. Much of the borough is covered by civil parishes, which form an additional tier of local government for their areas, although the two largest towns of Maidenhead and Windsor are unparished.

=== Westminster ===
The Royal Borough is represented at Westminster by two members of parliament: Jack Rankin of the Conservative Party (for Windsor) and Joshua Reynolds of the Liberal Democrats (for Maidenhead). Maidenhead was held by the Conservative Party since its creation in 1997 until 2024. Windsor has been held by the same party since 1874 with varying representation from its 1484 creation including more than 350 initial years with two MPs. Small parts of other districts, notably Slough and Wokingham have intermittently been included in each constituency to prevent malapportionment which is a definition of boundaries which causes any MP to serve a significantly different number of potential voters (electors) than the others.

The irregular, elongated shape of the Windsor seat being the south-east half of the Borough has been criticised by academics who noted the net changes which the Heath administration led through Parliament in 1972, implemented in 1974, intensified difference. They frequently grouped right-leaning suburban areas within urban historic centres and more modern, urban left-leaning areas such as the bulk of Slough. This ostensibly amounted to nationwide gerrymandering or homogenisation to install a greater number safe seats at the expense of marginal seats however also reflected the majority of social associations of people in each area.

=== Parish and town councils ===
There are 14 parish councils and 1 town council in the borough:

- Bisham
- Bray
- Cookham
- Cox Green
- Datchet
- Eton (town)
- Horton
- Hurley
- Old Windsor
- Shottesbrooke
- Sunningdale
- Sunninghill and Ascot
- Waltham St Lawrence
- White Waltham
- Wraysbury

The towns of Maidenhead and Windsor are unparished.

== Economy ==
As of December 2023, Windsor and Maidenhead has an employment rate of 82.3% (between those aged 16 to 64), higher than South East England as a whole. The claimant count of the borough – the number of people claiming unemployment-related benefits between the ages of 16 and 64 – is 2.3%.

== Education ==
The Windsor and Maidenhead LEA provides a comprehensive system, with a three-tier successive school system in Windsor, and two-tier education elsewhere. Colleges and sixth forms are available in the main two towns as well as across its borders in Egham, Slough and Wokingham.

== Freedom of the Borough ==
The following people and military units have received the Freedom of the Borough of Windsor and Maidenhead.

=== Individuals ===
- Princess Elizabeth, Duchess of Edinburgh: 1947.
- Charles, Prince of Wales: 1970.
- Queen Elizabeth the Queen Mother: 1980.
- Prince Philip, Duke of Edinburgh: 1995.
- Thomas Bailey: 1974.
- Stanley Platt: 1974.
- Sir John Smith: 1975.
- James Matthews: 1988.
- Peter Gray: 1994.
- Geoffrey Blacker: 1996.
- Sir Nicholas Winton: 1999.
- Harry Parker: 1999.
- Sir Clive Woodward: 2003.
- David Lunn: 2008.
- David Oram: 2012.

=== Military Units ===
- The Royal Berkshire Regiment: 1959.
- The Duke of Edinburgh's Royal Regiment: 1960.
- The Household Cavalry: 1965.
- The Brigade of Guards: 1968.
- The Berkshire Yeomanry: 1993.
- The Royal Gloucestershire, Berkshire and Wiltshire Regiment: 1999.
- The Rifles: 2006.

== Twin towns ==
The Royal Borough of Windsor and Maidenhead is twinned with the following Towns:

- Neuilly-sur-Seine, France – established 1955 with Royal Borough of New Windsor.
- Saint-Cloud, France – established 1957 with Maidenhead.
- Bad Godesberg, Germany – established 1960 with Maidenhead.
- Goslar, Germany – established 1969 with Royal Borough of New Windsor.
- Frascati, Italy – established 1972 with Maidenhead.
- Kortrijk, Belgium – established 1981 with Royal Borough of Windsor and Maidenhead.
