= Eton Town Council Offices =

Municipal building in Eton, Berkshire, England

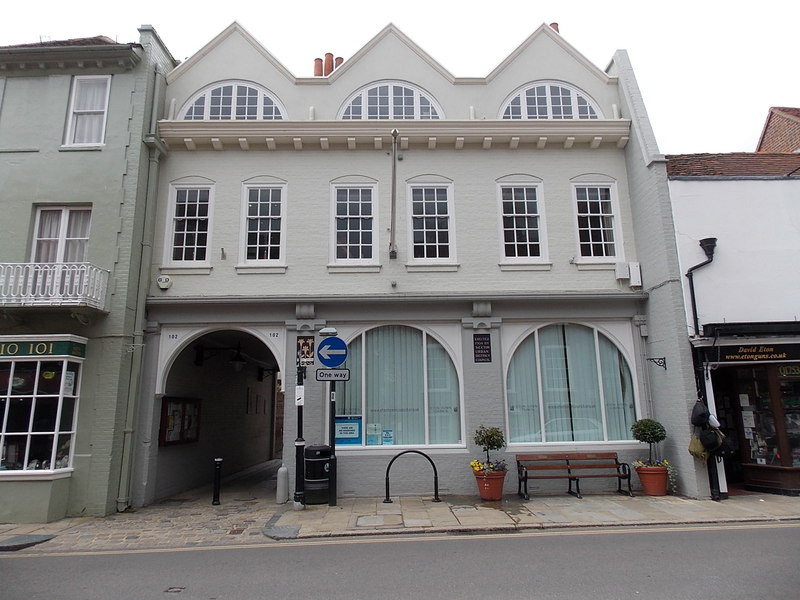
- The building in 2013

- Shown in Berkshire
- 51.4877°N 0.6092°W
- Location: High Street, Eton

History
- Built: 1904

Site notes
- Architectural style: Queen Anne style

Eton Town Council Offices is a municipal building in the High Street in Eton, a town in Berkshire, in England. The building, which serves as the meeting place of Eton Town Council, is a locally listed building.

== History ==
=== The old council offices ===
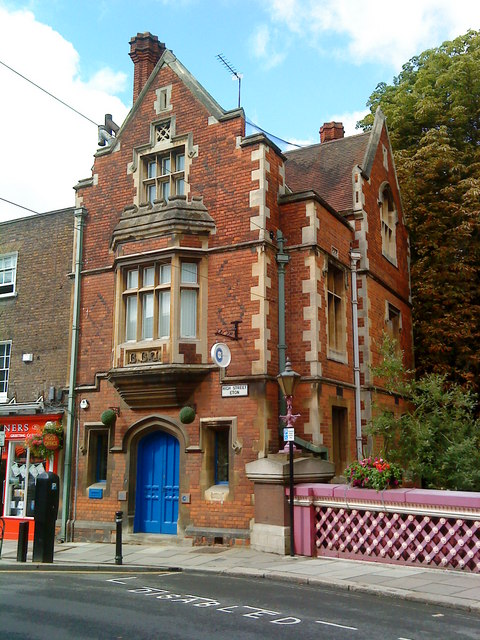
Bridge House, 138 High Street

Following significant population growth, largely associated the development of Eton College, a local board was appointed in Eton on 6 October 1849. For its first 40 years the Eton Local Board met at various rented rooms in the town. The Baldwin's Bridge Trust, a charity with responsibility for maintaining the adjoining bridge over the stream called Barnes Pool, commissioned a new building at 138 High Street in the 1880s. It was designed in the Gothic Revival style, built in red brick with stone dressings and was completed in 1890. It featured an arched doorway with a hood mould flanked by recessed casement windows with hood moulds. There was an oriel window on the first floor and a mullioned and transomed window on the second floor with a stepped gable above. The building at 138 High Street was designed to serve both as offices for the trust itself and to provide offices and a council chamber for Eton Local Board. The board held its first meeting in the new building on 1 January 1891.

The local board was succeeded by Eton Urban District Council in 1894. The urban district council continued to be based at 138 High Street until around 1957, when it moved to 102 High Street. The building at 138 High Street was then converted for commercial use and, as Bridge House, now serves as the premises of a cosmetic surgery practice.

=== The new council offices ===
The current building was commissioned by the council as the town's fire station. It was designed in the Queen Anne style, built in brick with a painted finish at a cost of £5,200 and was completed in 1904. The design involved a symmetrical main frontage of three bays facing onto the High Street. It featured three round headed openings for access by the fire engines on the ground floor, six sash windows on the first floor and three Diocletian windows on the second floor, all surmounted by three gables. A plaque depicting the coat of arms of Eton was fixed to the main frontage. A roll of honour, to commemorate fire service personnel who had served in the First World War, was unveiled in the building in February 1921. The council continued to use horse-drawn fire engines until a motorised fire engine was acquired in 1922.

After the fire service moved to St Leonards Road in Windsor, the building became the headquarters of the urban district council in around 1957. It continued to serve as the local seat of government until the enlarged Windsor and Maidenhead Borough Council was formed in 1974. It subsequently became the offices and meeting place of Eton Town Council.
