= St Mary Magdalene's Church, Boveney =

Coordinates: 51.4903°N 0.6474°W

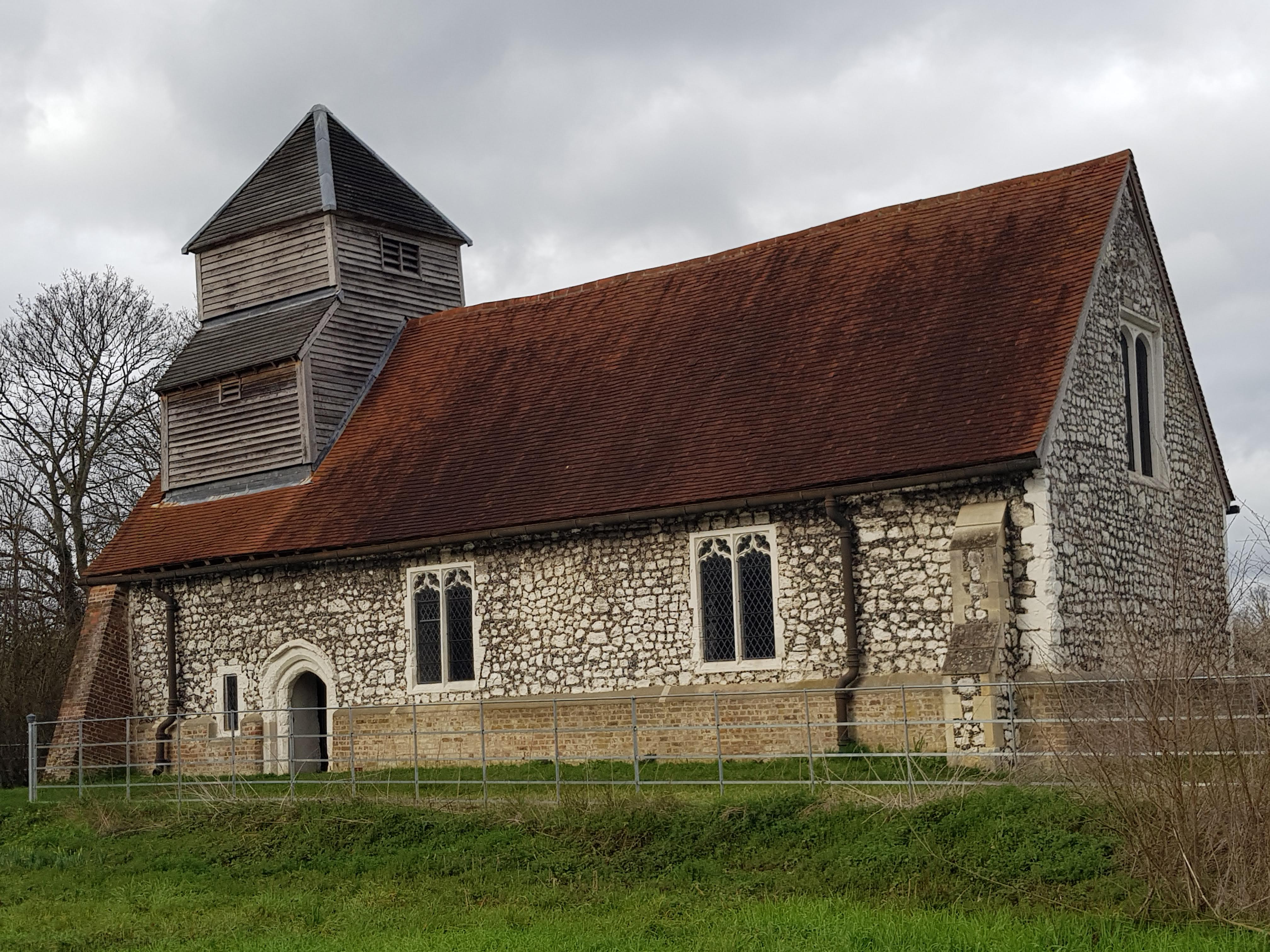
- St Mary Magdalene's Church, Boveney, from the southeast

- Location in Buckinghamshire
- OS grid reference: SU 940 776
- Location: Boveney, Buckinghamshire
- Country: England
- Denomination: Anglican
- Website: Friends of Friendless Churches

History
- Dedication: Mary Magdalene

Architecture
- Functional status: Redundant
- Heritage designation: Grade I
- Designated: 23 September 1955
- Architectural type: Church
- Groundbreaking: 12th century
- Completed: 15th century

Specifications
- Materials: Flint and chalk rubble, with ashlar dressings

St Mary Magdalene's Church is a redundant Anglican church standing close to the river on the north bank of the Thames, near the village of Boveney, Buckinghamshire, England. It is about 3 kilometres (2 mi) to the west of Eton College. The church, dedicated to Jesus' companion Mary Magdalene, is recorded in the National Heritage List for England as a designated Grade I listed building, and is under the care of the Friends of Friendless Churches. A 360° Google Street View Tour of the church is available.

== Early history ==
A church has been on the site since before the Norman conquest, but the fabric of the present church dates from the 12th century. Windows and the tower were added in the 15th century. The church was built to serve the bargemen working on the River Thames; there was a quay alongside the church but there are now no remains of this. It was a chapel of ease to St Peter's Church, Burnham. An attempt to make it into a separate parish in 1737 failed because sufficient endowment could not be raised. Probably in the middle of the 19th century, a dado of bricks was added to the exterior in an attempt to keep out damp, and in 1897 the window tracery was replaced.

== Architecture ==
St Mary's in constructed in flint and chalk rubble, with ashlar dressings. Small fragments of flint have been inserted in the mortar; this process is partly functional and partly decorative, and is known as galletting. The tower is weatherboarded; it stands on a timber framework, which itself stands on the ground. The door is in the south wall. High in the west wall is a small narrow lancet window that probably dates from the 12th century. Inside the church, some of the original 15th-century pews are still present. Other fittings date from the 18th and 19th centuries. Contained in a glass-fronted box on the north wall of the church are fragments of painted and gilded alabaster sculptures, possibly dating from the 15th century; these depict biblical themes. There is a ring of three bells. The largest of these dates from about 1536 and was cast at the foundry in Reading; the other two bells were cast in 1631 and 1636 by Ellis I. Knight.

== Recent history and present day ==
The church was declared redundant in 1975, and it was planned to demolish it or convert it into residential accommodation. However following a local campaign, it passed into the care of the charity the Friends of Friendless Churches in 1983. The charity holds a 999-year lease with effect from 10 June 1983. The church is still consecrated, and has been used for occasional services since 1983. However the church then had to be closed because it was found that the tower had become unstable, and repair was essential. When 19th-century plaster was removed from the footings of the tower, it was found that they were almost completely rotten. The cost of the repair totalled £200,000. Of this, 70% was received as a grant from English Heritage, and the remainder was raised from a number of sources. These included Sir John Smith and the Francis Coales Charitable Foundation, and Eton College who donated the proceeds of their annual "Concert for the Choir". The repair of the tower has been completed, and in 2010–11 another round of repairs is underway, including work on the windows. The repair work carried out on the tower won the Royal Institute of British Architects South Conservation Award for Architects in 2005.

== Gallery ==
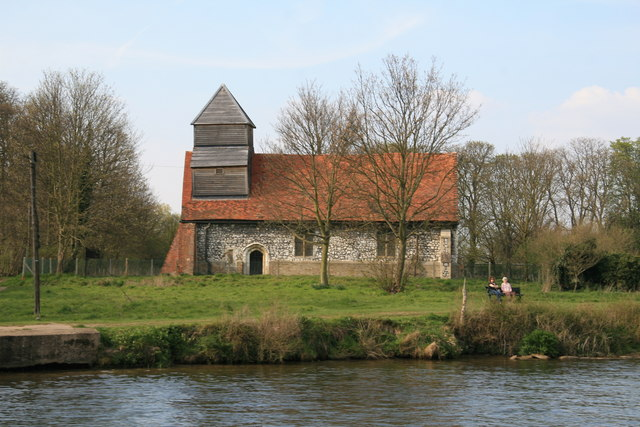
The church as viewed from the River Thames

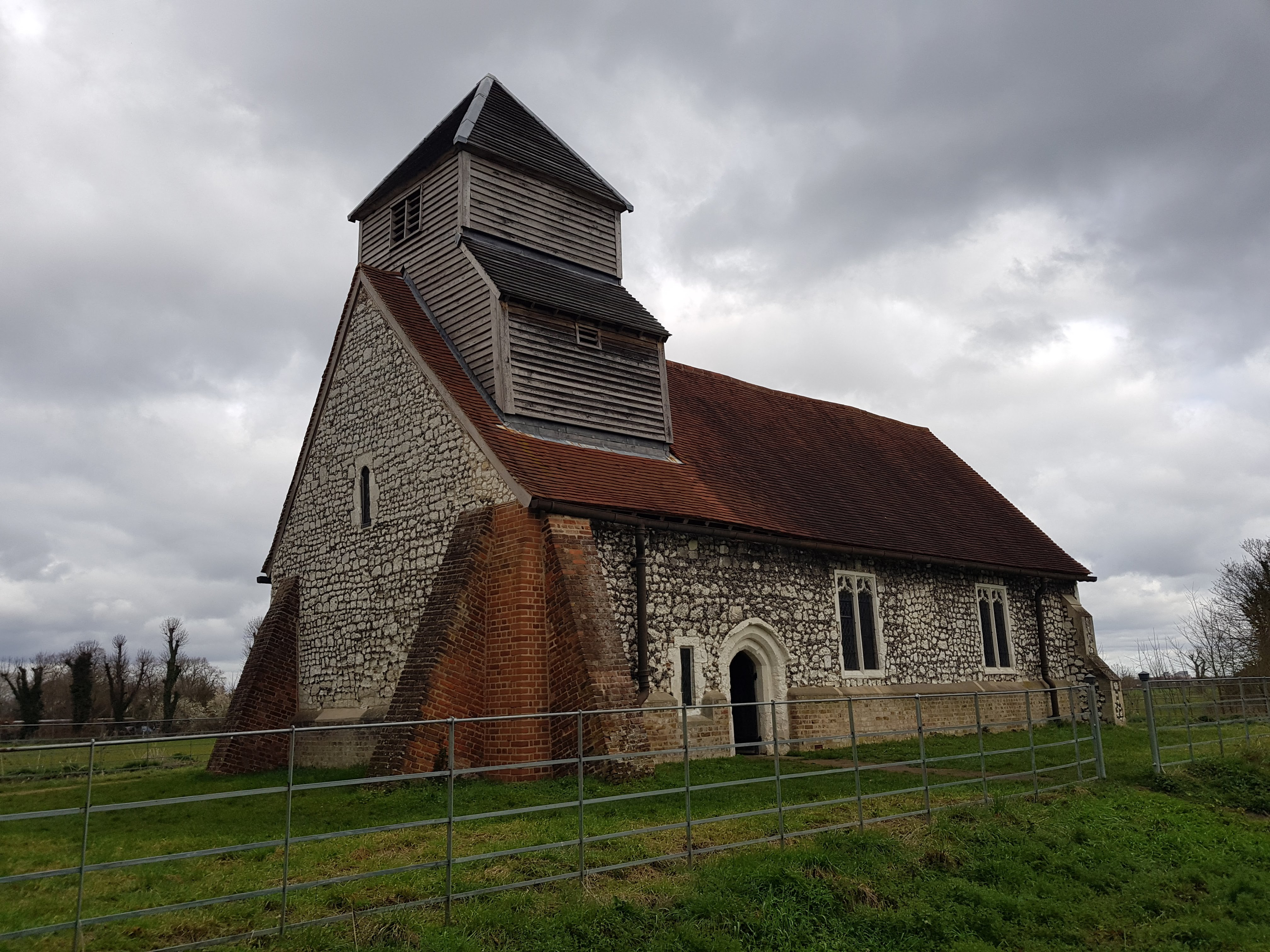
Exterior, from the southwest

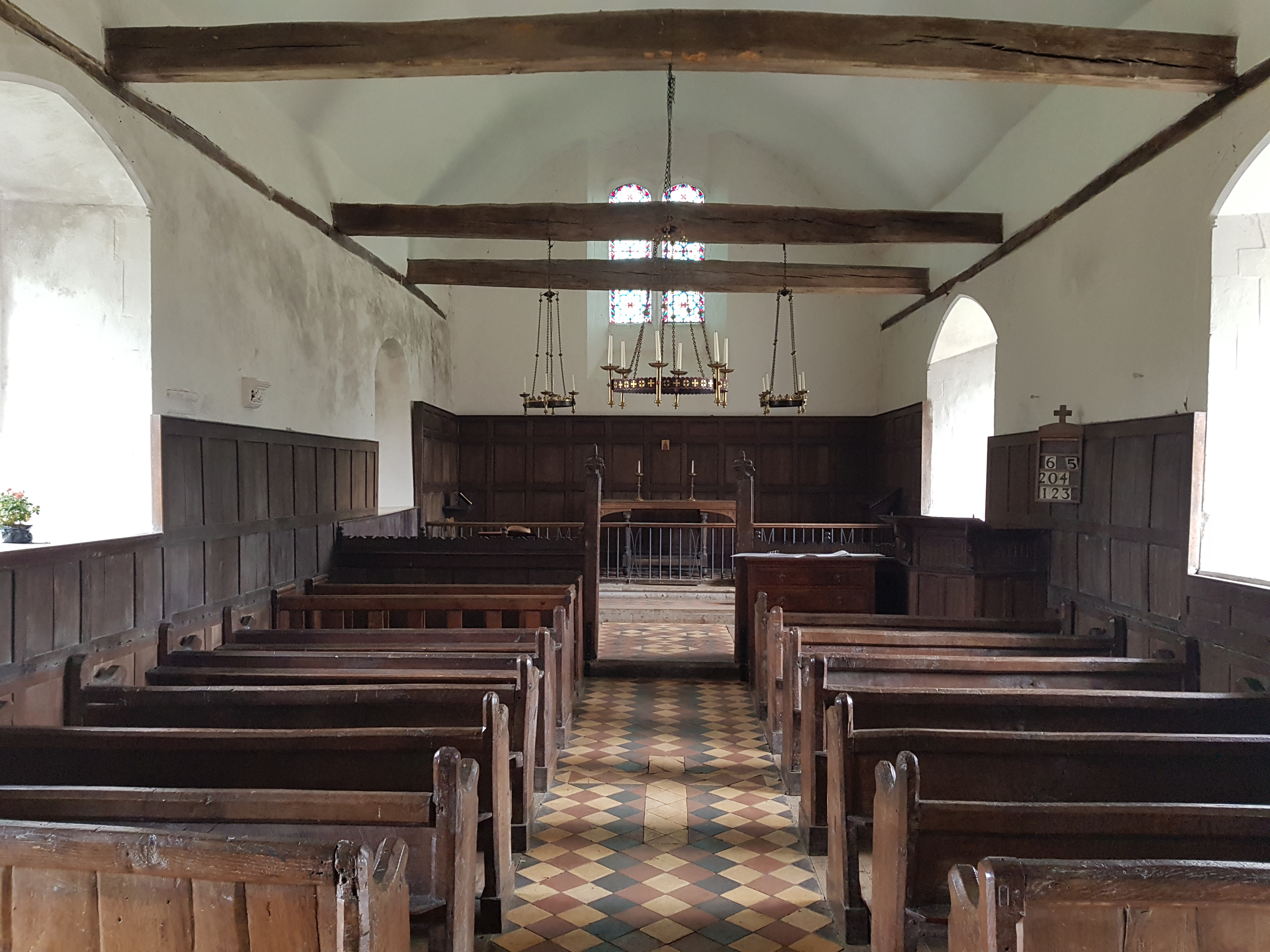
Interior, looking east

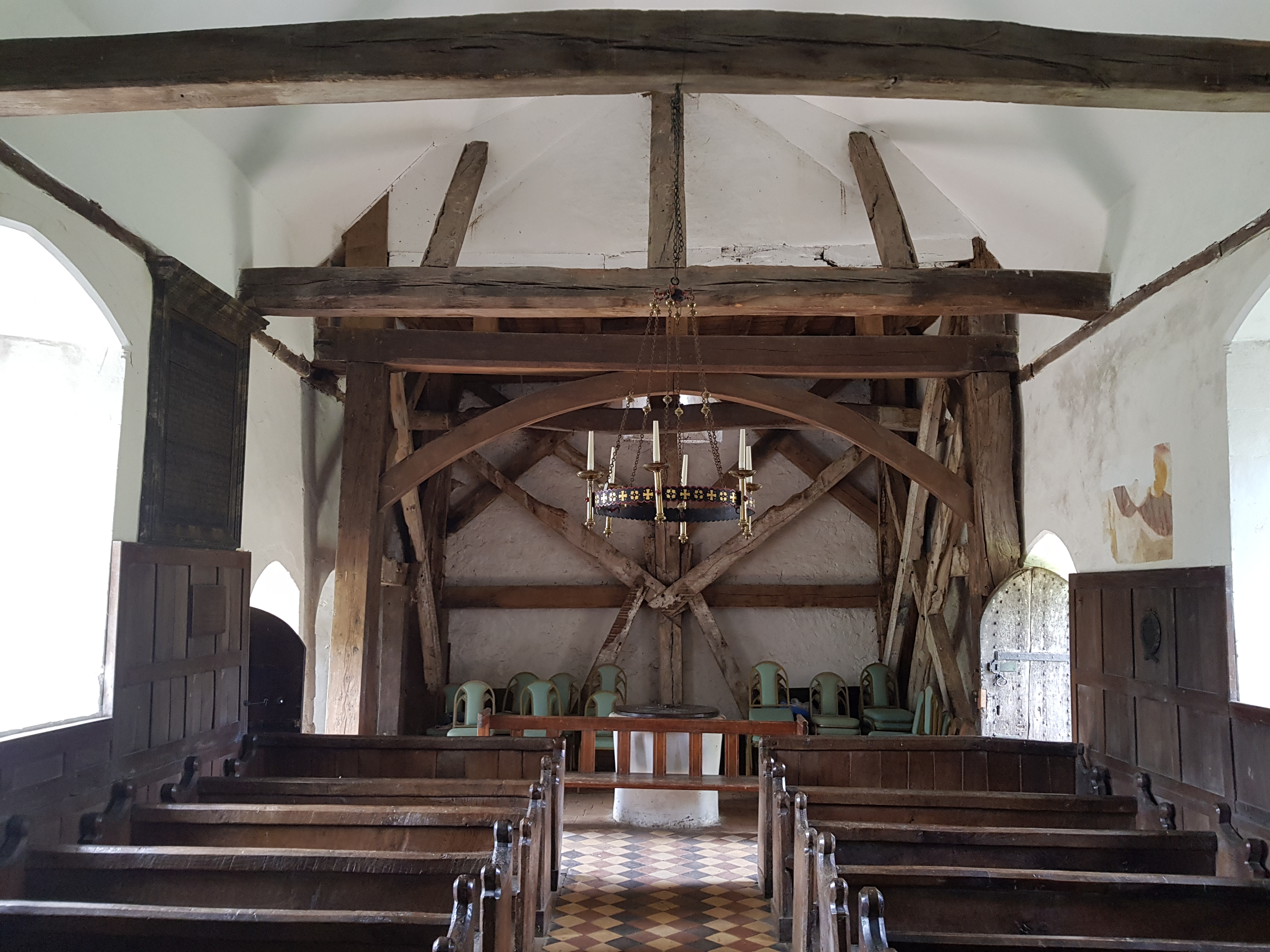
Interior, looking west towards base of tower
