= Eton Wick =

Coordinates: 51°29′49″N 0°38′17″W

- Village
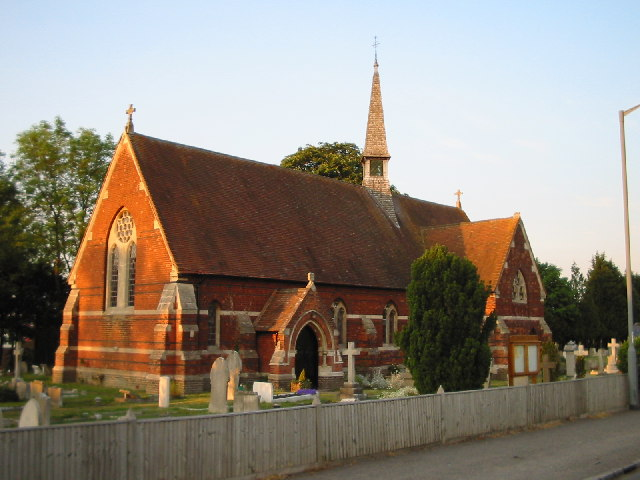
- Parish Church of St John the Baptist

- Location within Berkshire
- OS grid reference: SU945785
- Civil parish: Eton
- Unitary authority: Windsor and Maidenhead
- Ceremonial county: Berkshire
- Region: South East
- Country: England
- Sovereign state: United Kingdom
- Post town: Windsor
- Postcode district: SL4
- Dialling code: 01753
- Police: Thames Valley
- Fire: Royal Berkshire
- Ambulance: South Central
- UK Parliament: Windsor

Eton Wick is a village in the civil parish of Eton, in the Windsor and Maidenhead district, in Berkshire, England. Historically it was part of Buckinghamshire. Between the River Thames and the Jubilee River, the village is close to the towns of Windsor, Eton and Slough. The village has a long history, with evidence of habitation dating back over 5,500 years, including a Neolithic causewayed enclosure and a variety of later historical periods marked by significant agricultural and social development.

== History ==
=== Prehistoric to medieval period ===
Eton Wick's history extends to the Neolithic era, as indicated by archaeological findings of a causewayed enclosure and various artefacts. Over centuries, the area evolved through Roman and Medieval periods, maintaining a predominantly agricultural character.

=== Early modern period ===
After the construction of Eton College in the 15th century, a small group of houses were built immediately west to the college grounds. Making up the homes of shoemakers, tailors, and college workers, the hamlet was physically separated from the rest of Eton by land owned by the college, and was known as the wick. The wick was on the very edge of the parish, on the opposite side of the border adjacent to the village; cottages were built to house farmhands working at nearby Bell Farm.

=== 18th and 19th century developments ===
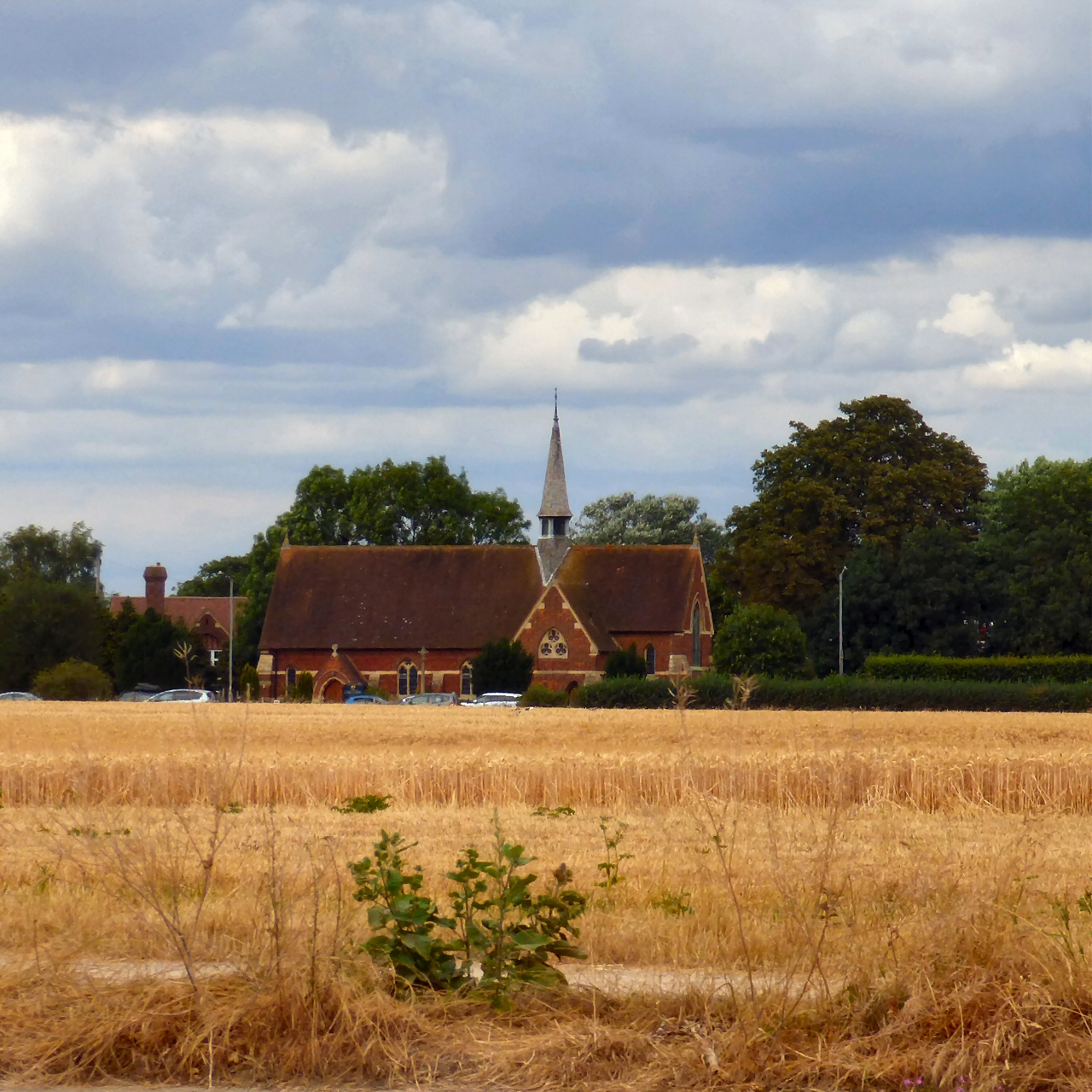
Looking across the fields toward the Parish Church

In the 18th century, Eton Wick saw changes in agriculture with the introduction of crop rotations and selective breeding. The village was traditionally managed through a system of Lammas rights, which allowed communal grazing on the commons. The 19th century brought industrial advances and the village began to modernize with the introduction of railway connections and better road infrastructure. The college was traditionally responsible for the social well-being of the settlement and throughout the 19th century, scholars at Eton College took a personal interest in the village. building a village hall and, in 1840, a small school in the village. Eton Wick Census records reveal that in 1851 that there were 76 children recorded as "Scholars". The village grew rapidly between the 1880s and the 2000s.

Eton Wick school was first opened in 1840 near the then Greyhound Public House.

In 1880, the owner of Bell Farm, Charles Dorney, sold some of his land for residential building. The new village was called Boveney New Town. After the Civil Parish Act 1894, the Wick was transferred from Eton parish to Boveney parish and became known as Eton Wick. Eton Wick and Boveney New Town were almost immediately next to each other yet both retained their own councils until 1934. The population of the villages during this time was around 500.

A new school was built in between 1886 and 1888 on Sheepcote Road and was upgraded and expanded in the 1950s, 1960s, and 1990s as the villagee grew in the 1950s, 1960s and 1990s.

=== 20th century and modern development ===
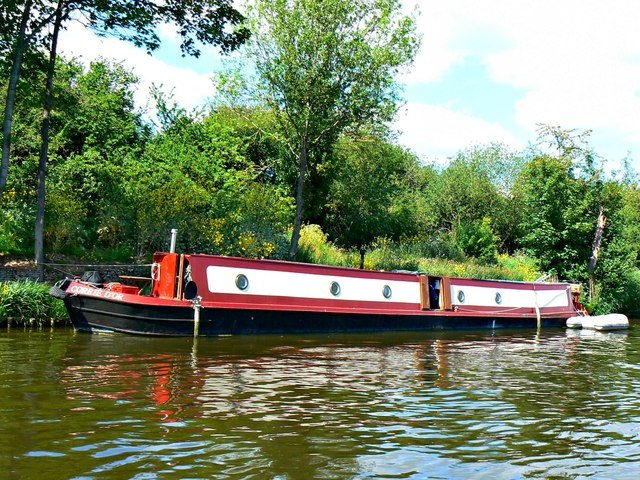
Narrowboat 'Corrie d'Or' on the River Thames at Eton Wick

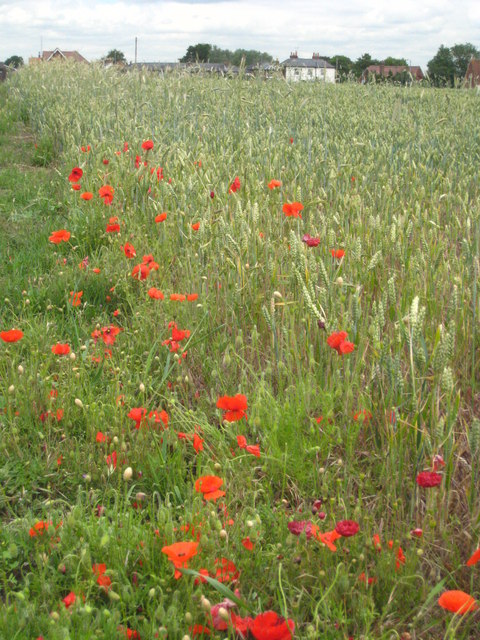
Poppies in a field at Eton Wick

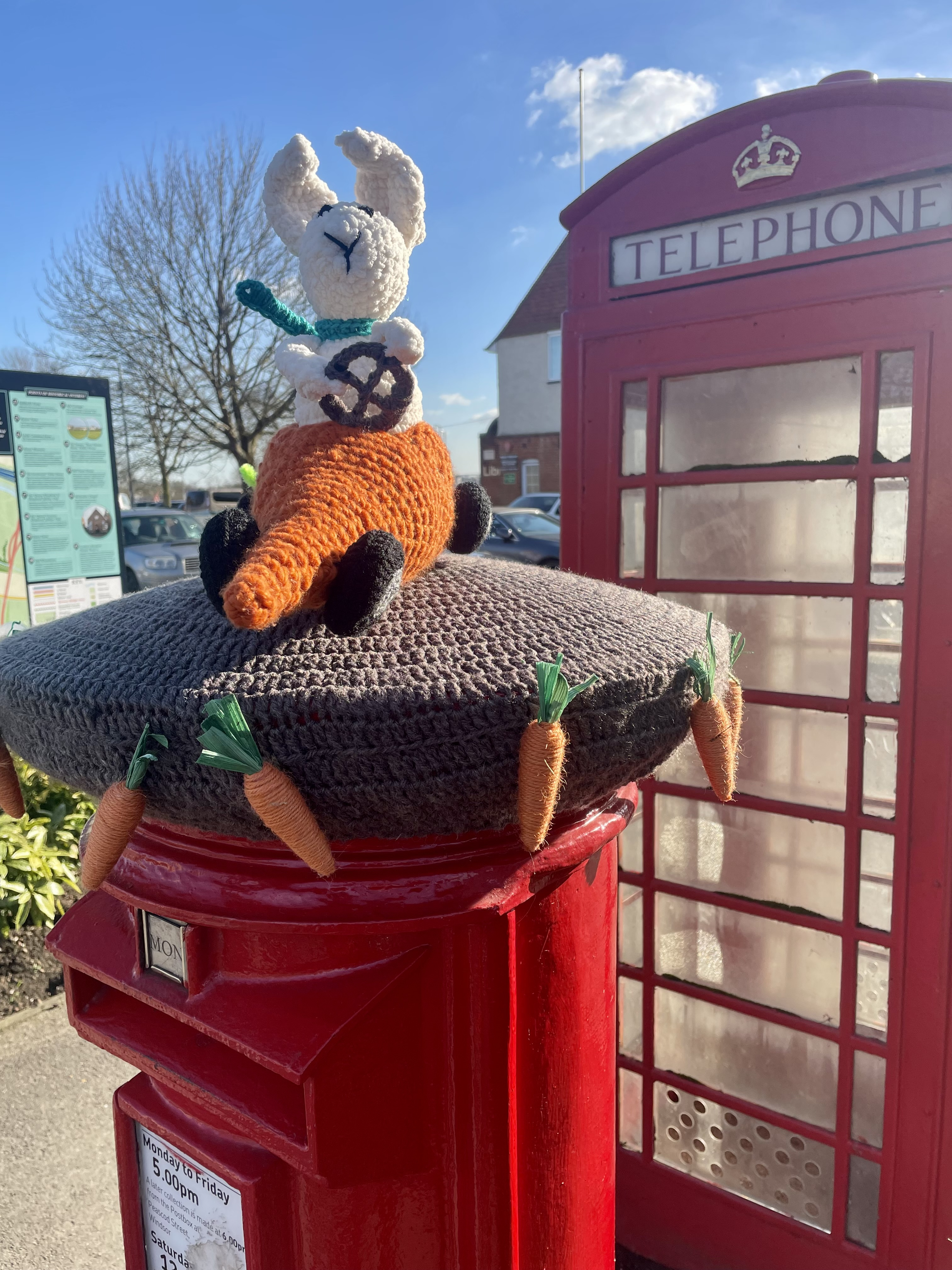
Postbox seasonal decorating in Eton Wick

The early 20th century was a period of significant social and physical development for Eton Wick. In 1906, Edward Littleton Vaughan, master at Eton College for 27 years, played a pivotal role in founding the Eton Wick and Boveney Institute, now known as the Village Hall, which became a social hub for the community. The hall was intended to foster fellowship and recreation, initially excluding, but later including, women and girls in its activities.

==== Prior to 1946 ====
During the World Wars, Eton Wick adapted to the national demands, with the village hall serving as a school for evacuees and a gathering place for community support activities.

Several 3.72” anti-aircraft guns of 564 Battery stationed on the SM7 Site in Dorney Common during WW2.

- Locals retrieved the body of a dead German fighter pilot from Thames Field after his parachute failed to deploy on June 29th, 1940.
- On 2nd October 1940 a bomb fell near East of Manor Farm Dorney and near Dorney Court.
- On 1st/2nd November 1940 1 high explosive and 3 unexploded HE bombs fell on Boveney.
- On 15th and 18th November 1940 1 unexploded bomb fell on Eton Wick.
- On 2nd November 1940, a bomb hit Dorney sewage works.
- On April 14th, 1941, 2 incendiary bombs fell on Eton Wick school and 'a number of incendiaries' fell on the allotments below the school in Sheepcote Road.
- During May 10th, 1941,1 or 2 small high explosive bombs fell on Dorney Army Camp along with an incendiary oil bomb that went in to the neighbouring Roundmoor Ditch. 2-12 bombs (depending on the person's account) fell on Dorney sewage works. Eton Wick also got a high explosive bomb that did not explode on impact.
- The German pilot, Oberleutnant Fisher, was captured near his shot down aircraft on September 30th, 1941.
- A bomb fell on February 22 or 23, 1944 making a crater 12ft by 5ft diameter and damaging 50 houses.

On the whole, damage was largely minimal.

The buildings of the camp from April/May, 1940 to 1944 or 1945, and it's AA-guns were on Dorney Common, but the armoury and a few other small building opposite Roundmoor Ditch were on the land now covered by Tillstone Close. It was permanently closed in 1945.

==== After 1945 ====
The armoury was converted in to a home and homeless people squatted in the Nissen huts between 1946 and 1947. The flood of 1947 damaged them beyond repair and the site was levelled in 1950, or 1945-1955, depending on the account given. They were rehoused during the housing building spree that occurred between 1945 and 1952.

Post-war Eton Wick witnessed a period of renewal, marked by the introduction of secondary education and the establishment of modern council housing bringing the population up to around 3,000.

In 1965, the land surrounding the village was registered as common land under the Commons Registration Act, meaning the land cannot be developed without permission from the Secretary of State for the Environment.

== Governance ==
There are two tiers of local government covering Eton Wick, at parish (town) and unitary authority level: Eton Town Council and Windsor and Maidenhead Borough Council. For national elections, the whole parish of Eton forms part of the Windsor constituency.

Eton Wick historically formed part of the ancient parish of Eton in the Stoke Hundred of Buckinghamshire. From 1849 the town of Eton was administered as a local board district, the boundaries of which were tightly drawn around the town itself. Under the Local Government Act 1894 such local board districts were reconstituted as urban districts and civil parishes were no longer allowed to straddle district boundaries. The part of the old Eton parish outside the urban district was therefore made a separate civil parish, which was named Eton Wick after the largest settlement within its area.

In 1934 the civil parish of Eton Wick was abolished and its area absorbed into the Eton Urban District, effectively reuniting the ancient parish. At the 1931 census (the last before the abolition of the civil parish), Eton Wick had a population of 506.

Eton was transferred from Buckinghamshire to Berkshire in 1974 under the Local Government Act 1972.

== Demographics and economy ==
Historically an agricultural village, Eton Wick has evolved with significant residential development. The local economy was traditionally based on farming, market gardening, and small-scale industries like laundries that serviced nearby Eton College. Today, the village is predominantly residential with local businesses supporting the community.

== Culture and community ==
Eton Wick has maintained a strong community spirit evidenced by its many local traditions and activities. Annual events such as the Eton Wick Horticultural Show and various community gatherings at the Village Hall highlight the village's social cohesion. The village hall, a central institution, continues to host events and activities, such as regular meetings of the Eton Wick History Group fostering a sense of community among residents. The village is also home to the History on Wheels motor museum, housing a wide collection of military and civilian vehicles, and militaria dating from 1900 to the 1950’s.

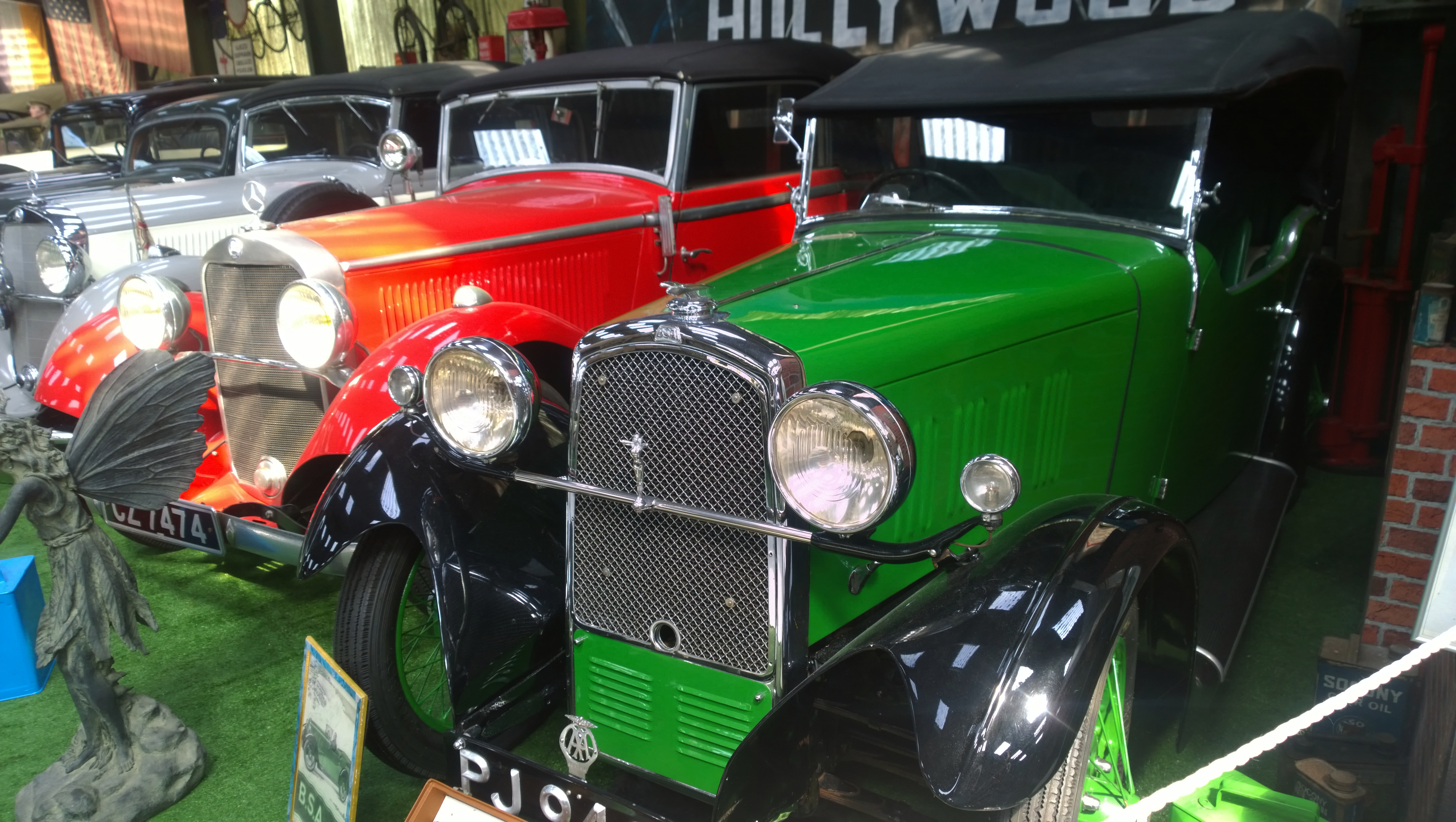
Vintage cars in the collection of the History on Wheels motor museum in Eton Wick.

== Education ==
Schools in the village include:

- Eton Wick Church of England First School - Eton Wick is in this school's catchment area

Schools for which Eton Wick is in the designated area for:

- Dedworth Middle School in Windsor
- St. Edward's Royal Free Ecumenical Middle School in Windsor
- Trevelyan Middle School in Windsor
- The Windsor Boys School
- The Windsor Girls School

== Notable resident ==
British actor, soldier, memorialist, and novelist David Niven moved to Wheatbutts Cottage in Eton Wick during the 1940s. Fellow actor Errol Flynn was known to visit Niven in the village.

== Transport ==
Eton Wick is served by Thames Valley Buses, with services between Eton, Maidenhead and Slough. Great Western Trains and Elizabeth line rail services from Slough railway station, Windsor & Eton Riverside railway station and Windsor & Eton Central railway station run east to London stations including Canary Wharf, London Paddington station; west to Maidenhead, Reading, Bristol, Cardiff and Swansea; and south west to Exeter, Plymouth and Penzance. The close proximity of the M4 and A4 also add to the Village's attraction as a popular commuter belt village.

== Local rivers ==
As it flows from Boveney to Windsor, the River Thames meets the Boveney Ditch stream just south east of Eton Wick. Boveney Ditch is formed by the merging of Roundmoor (drainage) Ditch and the habitually dried up Cress Brook just west of Eton Wick. Roundmoor Ditch is in fact a modified chalk-fed stream It has a catchment area of 1,832.079 ha and a length 8.781 km. After Romney Lock and weir, the Thames is fed by Colenorton Brook (called Common Ditch upstream of Eton College) and then the Willow Brook (called Chalvey Ditch upstream of the College) to the east of Eton Wick. More recently the Jubilee River, an artificial secondary channel to the Thames, was built between Maidenhead and Datchet for flood relief. It was completed in 2002 and runs to the north of Eton Wick, cutting through the Roundmoor, Chalvey and Common Ditches, which are all carried in siphons beneath it to continue on their original courses.

== Sport and leisure ==
Eton Wick has a local football team, Eton Wick F.C., that plays at Hayward's Mead.

== See also ==
- Baths Island

== Sources ==
- Ditchfield, P.H.; Page, W.H., eds. (1923). A History of the County of Buckingham, Volume 3. Victoria County History. pp. 261–275.
- Pevsner, Nikolaus (1966). Berkshire. The Buildings of England. Harmondsworth: Penguin Books. pp. 132–133.
