= Dorney =

Village in Buckinghamshire, England

Coordinates: 51.502°N 0.676°W

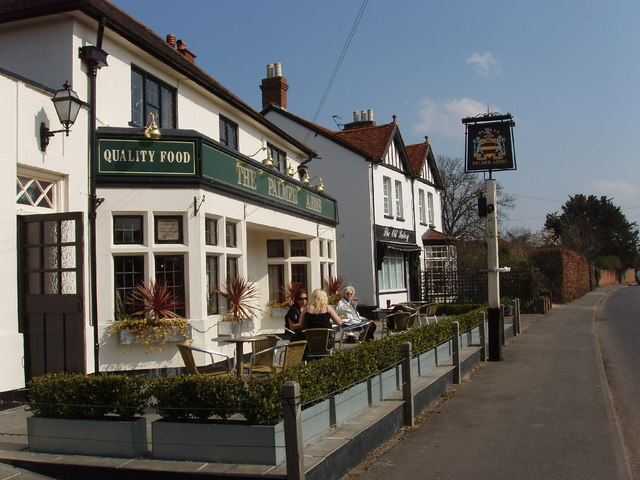
- Village centre

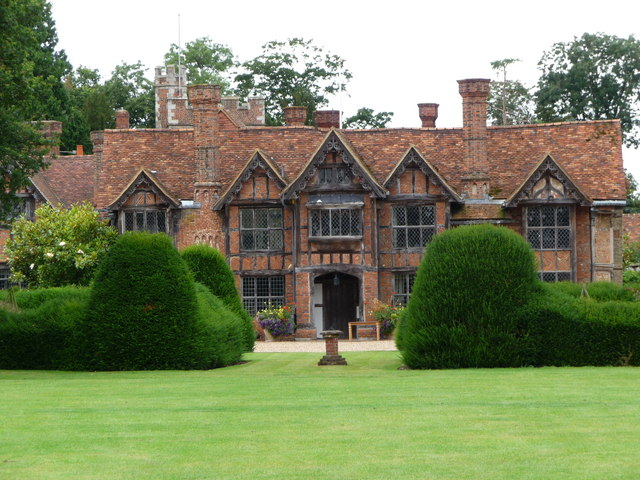
- Dorney Court – its Grade I listed building

- Location within Buckinghamshire
- Area: 5.45 km^{2} (2.10 sq mi)
- Population: 752 (2011 census)
  - Density: 138/km^{2} (360/sq mi)
- OS grid reference: SU9279
- Civil parish: Dorney
- Unitary authority: Buckinghamshire
- Ceremonial county: Buckinghamshire
- Region: South East
- Country: England
- Sovereign state: United Kingdom
- Post town: WINDSOR
- Postcode district: SL4
- Dialling code: 01628
- Police: Thames Valley
- Fire: Buckinghamshire
- Ambulance: South Central
- UK Parliament: Beaconsfield

Dorney is a village and civil parish in Buckinghamshire, England. It borders the River Thames to the west and south, and is bisected by the Jubilee River. In 2011 it had a population of 752. It is 2.3 miles (3.7 km) west of neighbouring Eton, which is a slightly larger parish.

It includes a Grade I listed manor house, Dorney Court, as well as the largest rowing lake in the south of England, Dorney Lake. Water accounts for 13% of the area of Dorney, the highest proportion in Buckinghamshire.

== History ==
Dorney Manor was mentioned in the Domesday Book, and was famed for honey; it is named after the Saxon for "Island of Bees".

=== Dorney Court ===
Dorney Court adjoins the centre of the village and has comparable grounds to other village-centre properties. It was, however, the manor house, so owned much of the land of the village until the late 18th century. It dates to the early Tudor period and is made from a timber frame with red brick. Its roof has original tiles. It has bold, star-shaped timbers and a large fireplace with panels from Faversham Abbey, Kent.

One account of its early history reveals that the then adjoining Boveney manor, at the southern end of the village of Burnham, had an oak tree cut down by an employee. He defended his conduct by declaring that at a court in Buckinghamshire previously found Dorney to be a royal manor and that the green was therefore common land, so it was legal to cut the tree down.

A notable owner was William Garrard, who bought Dorney Court in 1542; he was later Lord Mayor of London from 1555 to 1556). Major C. H. D. Palmer owned it in 1925, having been passed down by earlier Palmers since 1624. Until after 1925, the manor's family owned the rectory and maintained the church, a state of affairs which ended with the ending of all tithes in England and Wales.

=== Other history ===
The first pineapple in the UK was grown in Dorney Court, leading to a pub in the village being named The Pineapple. It is Grade II listed for its age, dating half to the 17th century and half to the 18th century.

In 1961, a cornfield in Dorney was the scene of a nationally reported abduction. A lone gunman, James Hanratty, abducted Valerie Storie and Michael Gregsten and forced them at gunpoint to drive to a lay-by at Maulden in Bedfordshire, where he shot and murdered Gregsten, raped Storie and shot her. She survived, paralysed.

== Topography ==
The village is on the north bank of the River Thames, on very gently sloping land towards the river and inchoate streams which were mostly joined into the Jubilee River, mainly on gravel-underlain soil.

Eton is 2.3 miles (3.7 km) to the east. Slough, which is linked by two roads forming a rectangle with Dorney, is 3.7 miles (6.0 km) east-northeast.

Major rowing events take place at Dorney Lake, including the 2012 Summer Olympics and annual events such as the Wallingford, Marlow and Metropolitan Regattas. The Olympics also hosted canoeing events there, which continue to take place occasionally.

In the south-east, Dorney Common is a large traditional grassed common, roughly triangular, which is a Site of Special Scientific Interest. Owing to the continued use of the land for grazing, the common has panoramic views of Windsor Castle two and a half miles to the east.

== Local administration ==
Dorney's civil parish council covers minor upkeep, community events and recreational matters. Dorney is surrounded to the south, east and west by the non-metropolitan county of Berkshire, with a narrow border along its north (with Taplow and Burnham) further towards the heart of Buckinghamshire. This anomaly makes Dorney a salient, which dates to the Local Government Act 1972, which came into force on 1 April 1974; the village had been originally included in Berkshire in the related Bill, but an amendment to keep it in Buckinghamshire was proposed by local MP Ronald Bell and accepted by the government.

== Features ==
There are 15 listed buildings in Dorney.

The village church's chancel and nave date from the 12th century, the tower was built about 1540, and the north chapel and porch were added in the 17th century. Restoration work in the 19th century somewhat obscured its medieval decoration.

Dorneywood country house takes its name from the parish, although is just over its northeastern border. It is used as a home (and entertainment or state reception venue) for a senior member of the UK government, usually a Secretary of State or other minister.

== Transport ==
The village has no railway station. A regular bus timetable operates to Windsor and Slough.

The village is partly bounded by the north by the M4 motorway, where there is a junction just after the road north from the village meets the A4 Bath Road for Slough 'West'. This provides access to Heathrow Airport and London, and has meant that since the road's construction, Dorney has been accessible to commuters from both London and the Thames Valley..

== Religion ==
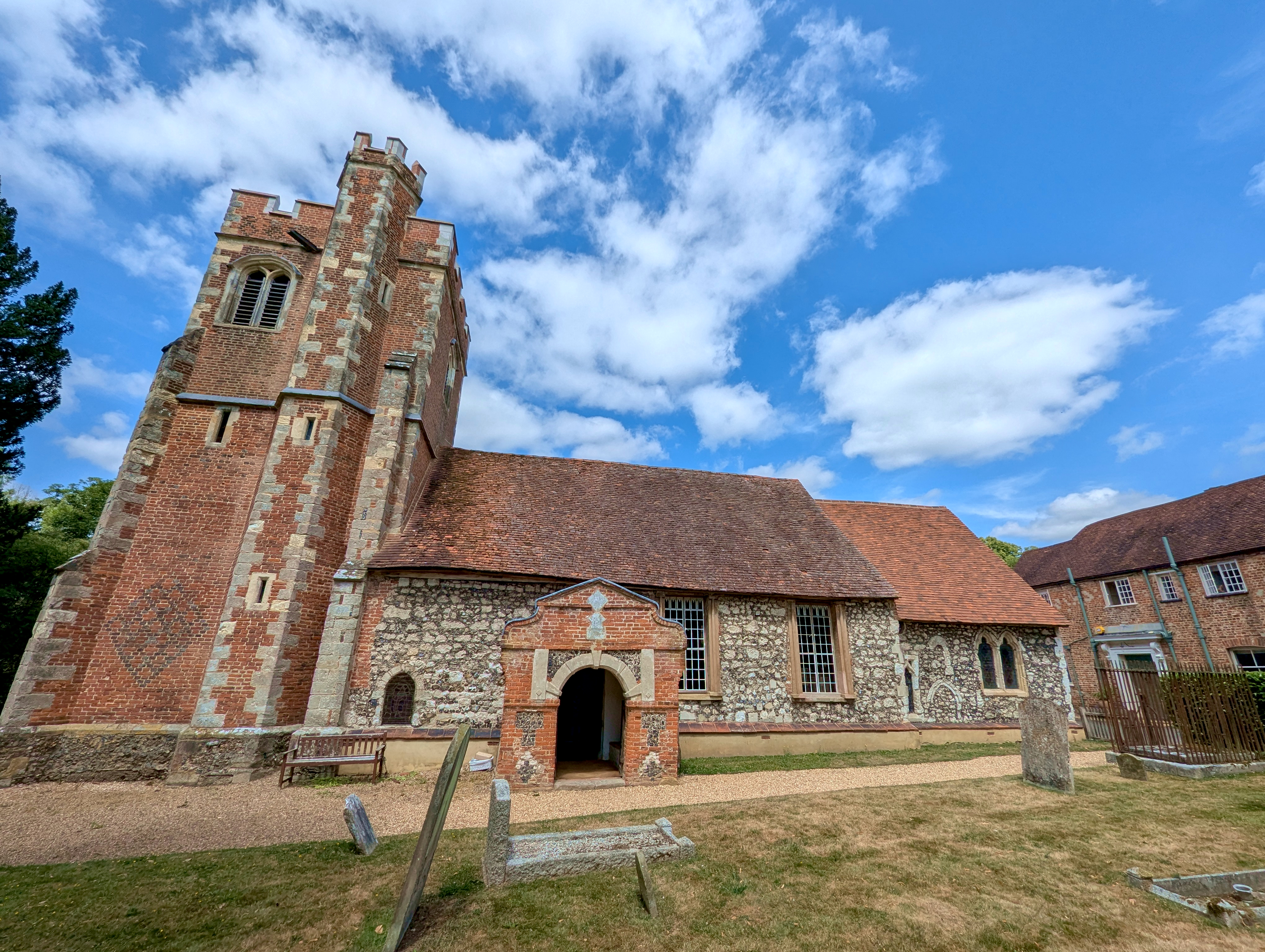
The Church Of England parish church of St. James The Less at the village of Dorney, Buckinghamshire, England. June 2025.

A majority of the inhabitants in 2011 (62.8%) described themselves as Christian. The sole parish church is Anglican and is dedicated to Saint James the Less.

More than 2% of the population are Hindu, Muslim, Jewish or Buddhist.

== Localities ==
In the parish of Dorney are the hamlets of Dorney Reach and Lake End; none centred more than 1 mile (1.6 km) apart.

=== Dorney Reach ===
Dorney Reach is a community on a riverside road, almost half of the homes of which are by the River Thames, overlooking Monkey Island. This side of the river is also the location of Bray Lock; its name is somewhat of a misnomer, as the village of Bray sits on the opposite side of the river from the lock.

=== Lake End ===
Lake End includes the Pineapple pub and is the only settled part north of the Jubilee River on the main northward road from the village. It has a public car park by the Jubilee River which enables access to its towpath and the buildings of Dorney and Lake End.

== Demography ==
2011 Published Statistics: Population, home ownership and extracts from Physical Environment, surveyed in 2005
Output area	Homes owned outright	Owned with a loan	Socially rented	Privately rented	Other	km^{2} roads	km^{2} water	km^{2} domestic gardens	km^{2} domestic buildings	km^{2} non-domestic buildings	Usual residents	km^{2}
Civil parish	96	104	31	46	4	0.098	0.728	0.301	0.035	0.017	752	5.45

== Nearest places ==
- Burnham — 2 miles
- Taplow — 2 miles
- Eton — 2 miles
- Maidenhead — 4 miles
