= Eton, Berkshire =

Town in Berkshire, England

Coordinates: 51.4881°N 0.6092°W

Eton
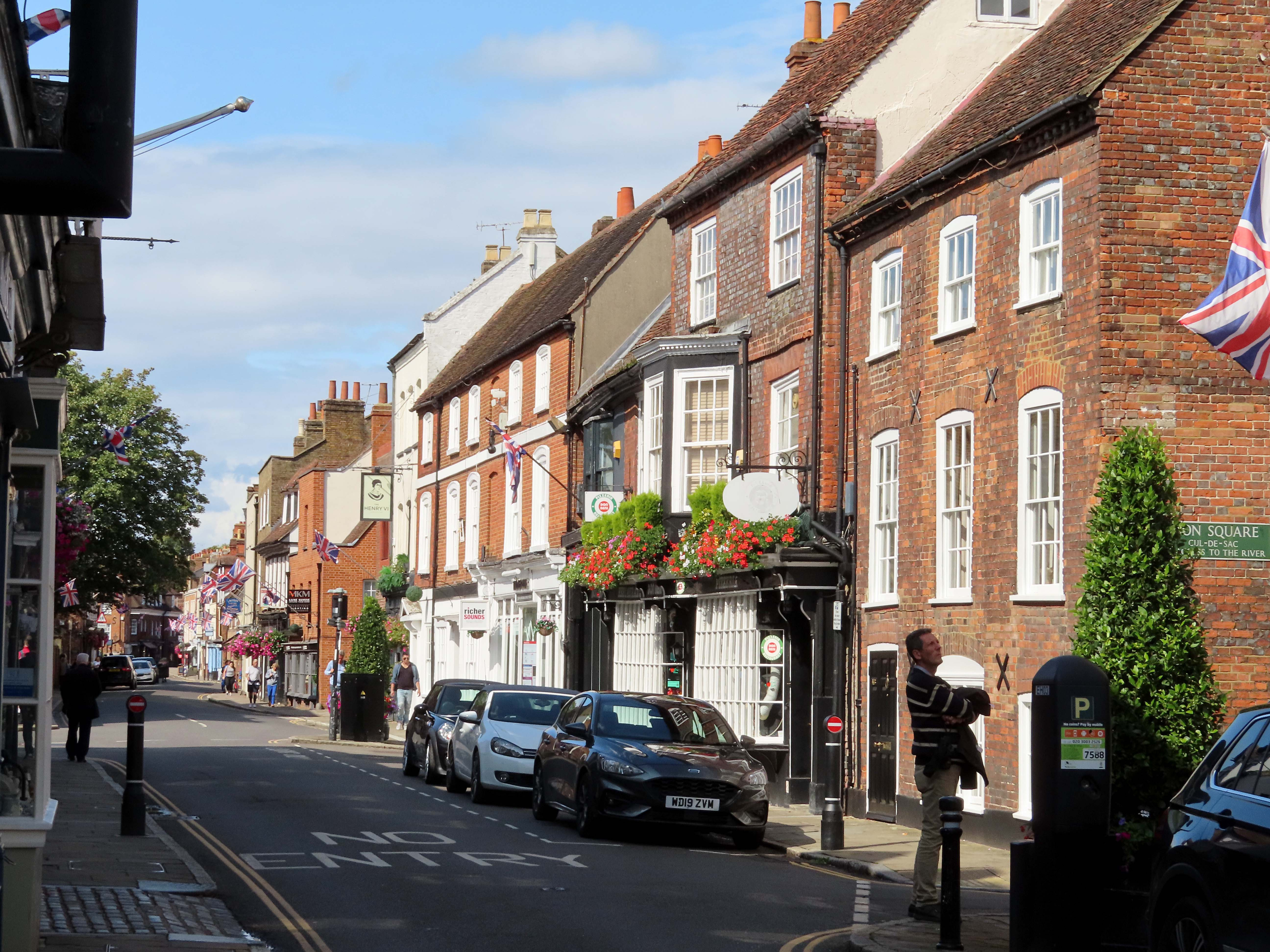
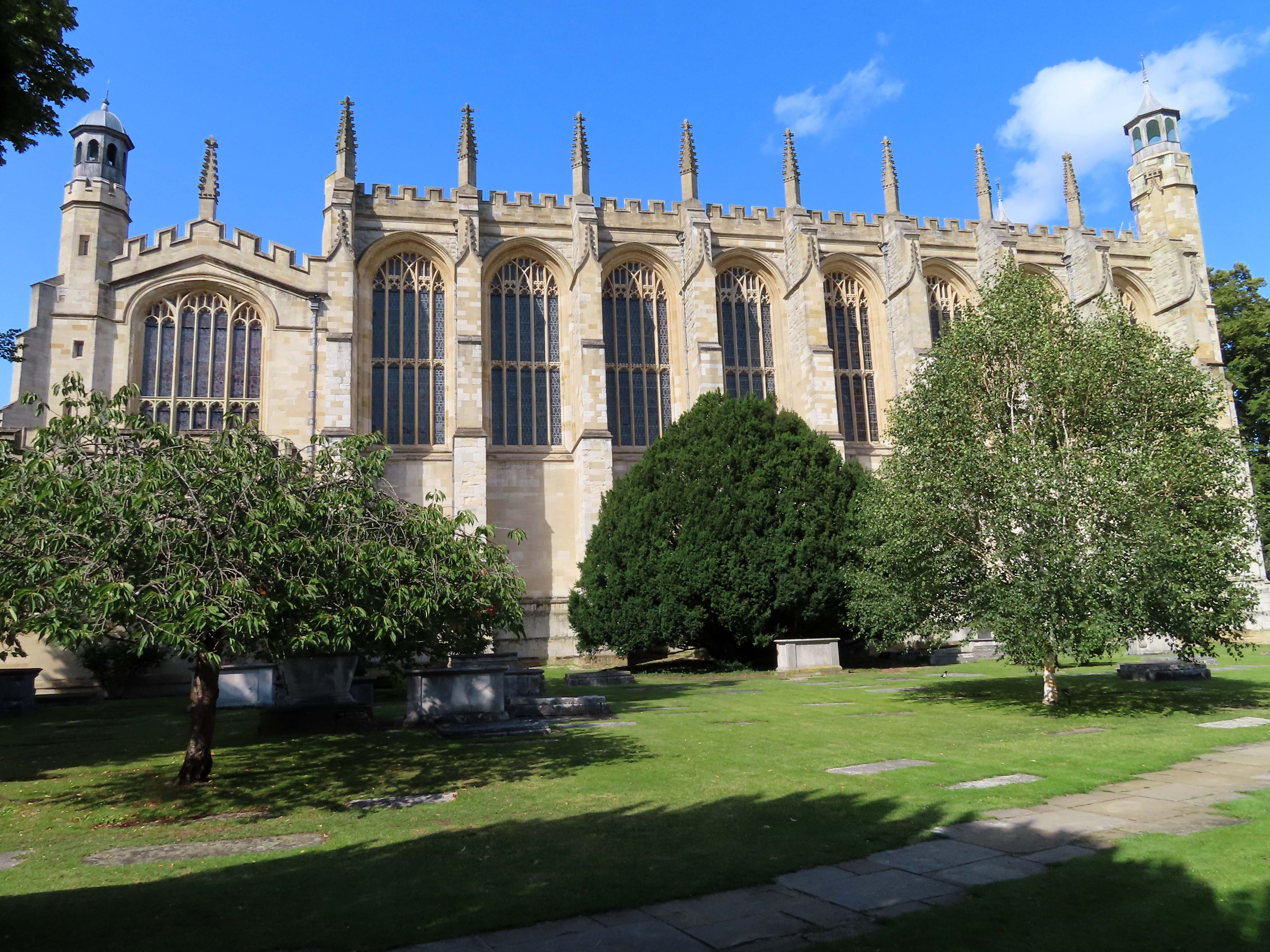
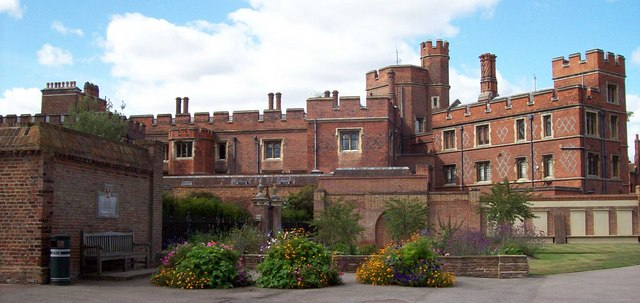
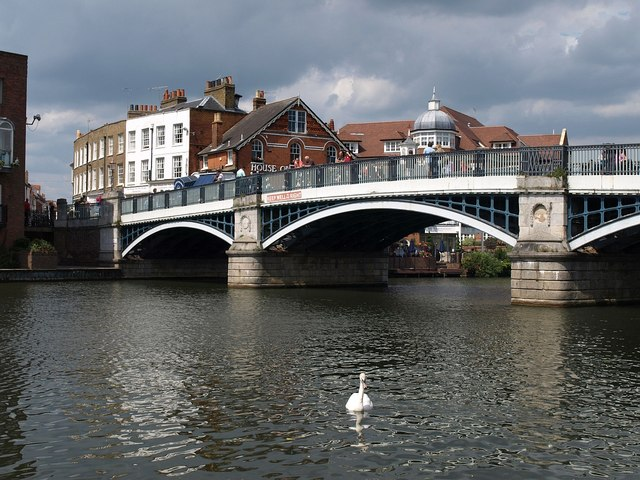
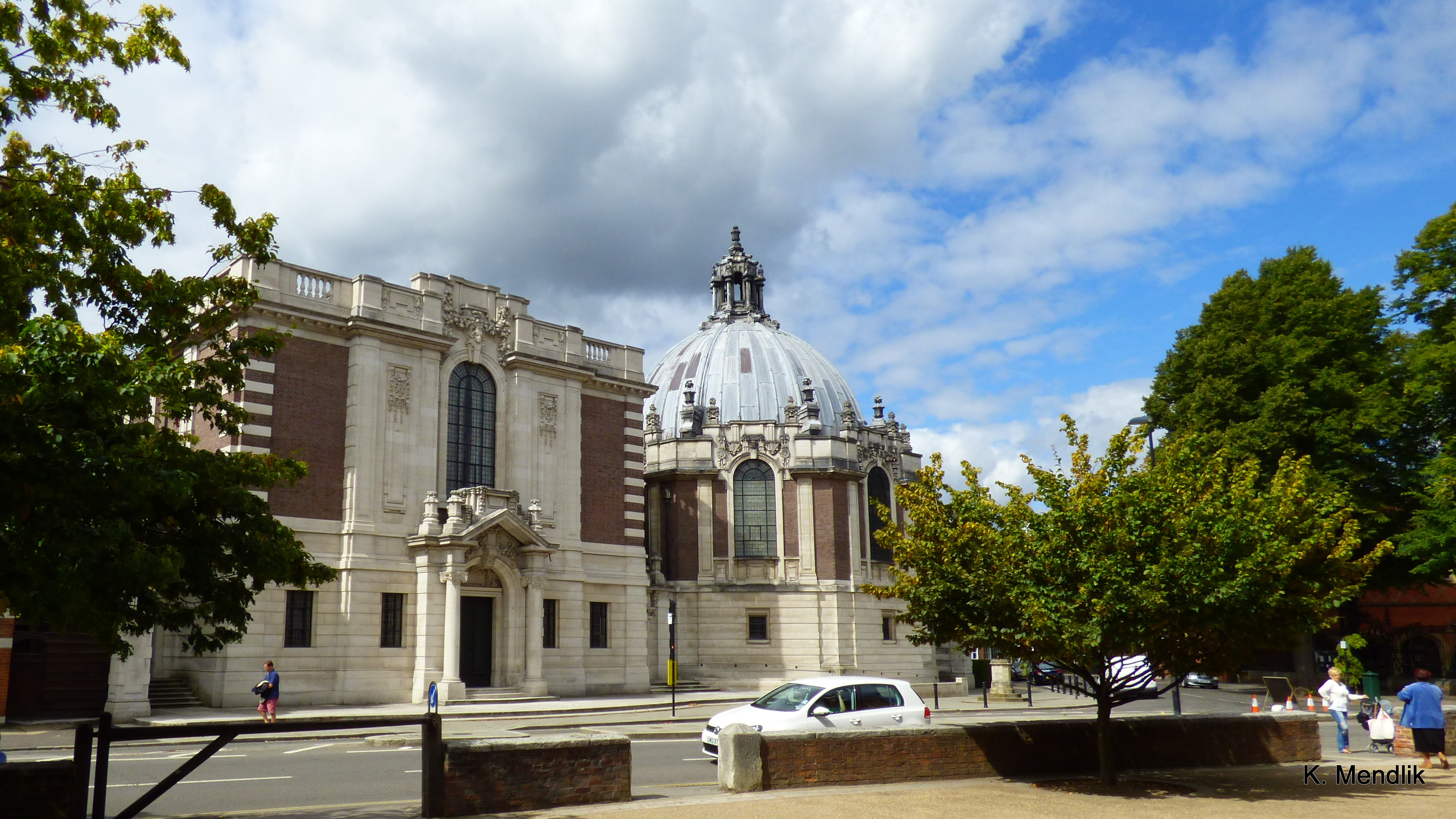
- Eton High Street Eton College Chapel Provost's Garden Windsor Bridge Eton College School Library

- Location within Berkshire
- Population: 4,692 (2011 Census)
- OS grid reference: SU965775
- Civil parish: Eton
- Unitary authority: Windsor and Maidenhead
- Ceremonial county: Berkshire
- Region: South East
- Country: England
- Sovereign state: United Kingdom
- Post town: WINDSOR
- Postcode district: SL4
- Dialling code: 01753
- Police: Thames Valley
- Fire: Royal Berkshire
- Ambulance: South Central
- UK Parliament: Windsor

Eton (/ˈiːtən/ EE-tən) is a town in the Royal Borough of Windsor and Maidenhead in Berkshire, England. It is located on the River Thames opposite the town of Windsor, to which it is connected by Windsor Bridge. The civil parish of Eton, which also includes the village of Eton Wick two miles west of the town, had a population of 4,692 at the 2011 census. The town is best known as the location of Eton College. Eton was historically within Buckinghamshire, being moved to Berkshire in 1974.

== History ==
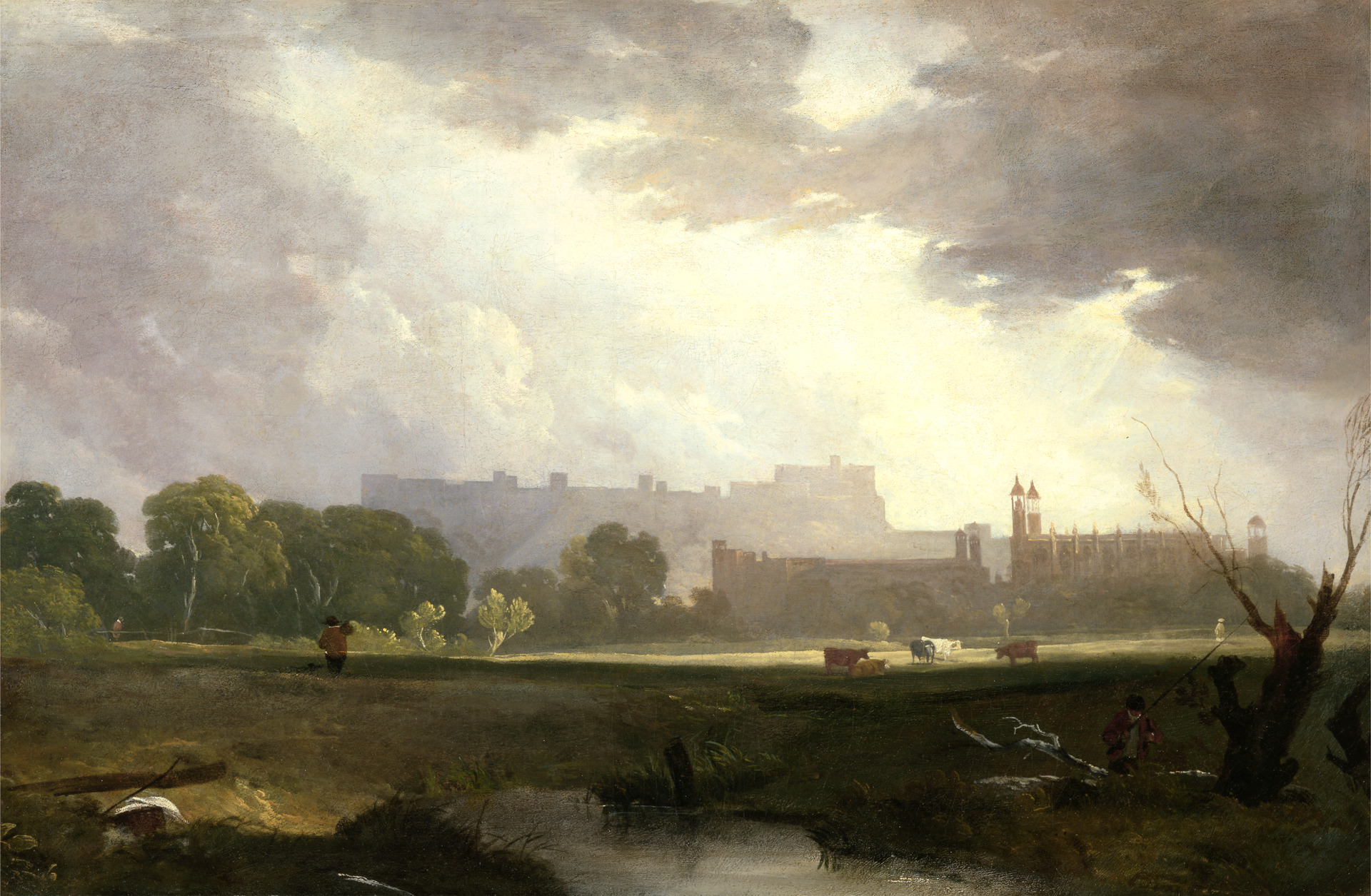
Windsor from Eton by Augustus Wall Callcott. A view towards Windsor Castle from Eton, 1809

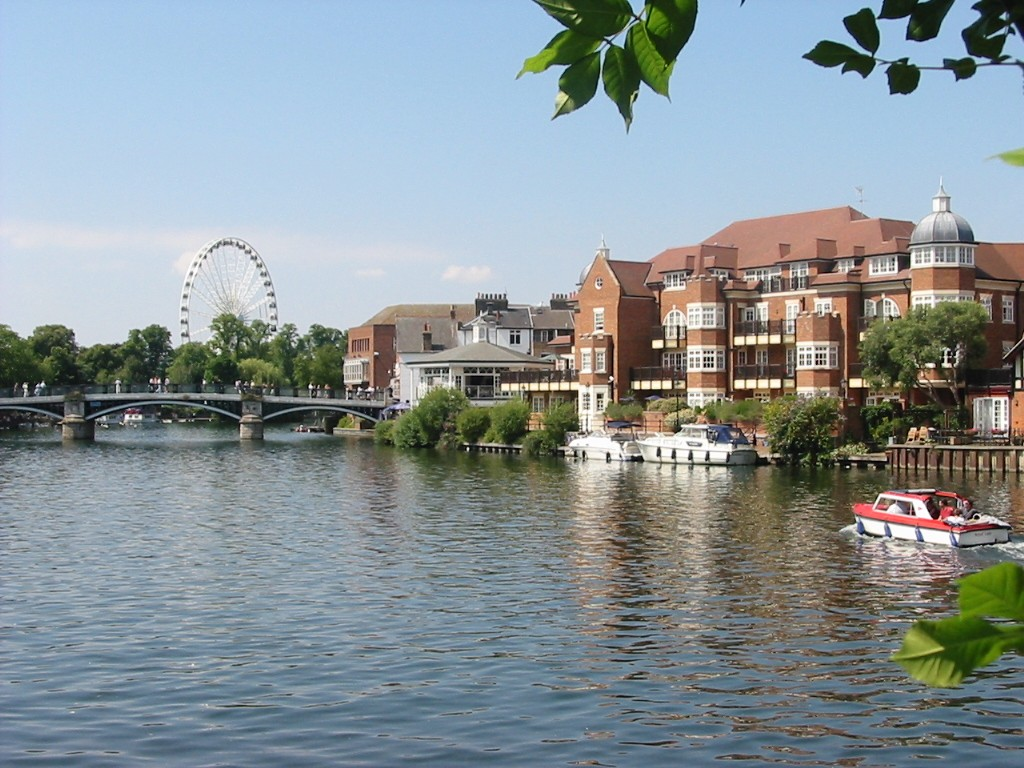
View of Eton looking across the River Thames from Windsor

The name derives from Old English Ēa-tūn, meaning "River-Town", a reference to Eton's proximity to the River Thames. The land that is now Eton once belonged to the manor of Queen Edith, wife of Edward the Confessor. The land was appropriated by the Normans after 1066; and by 1086, the lord was Walter son of Other. The main road between Windsor and London went through the area and a hamlet sprang up amid pasture meadows to maintain the road and the bridge. In 1440, Henry VI chose Eton as the location for his new college, Eton College. Workmen were moved into Eton to build the college. All of the land immediately around the hamlet was granted to the college, which stopped further growth. The new college chapel made the village a pilgrimage point, and inns were set up along the High Street. Henry VI gave the college the right to hold fairs on its grounds.

During the English Civil War, after Windsor Castle was captured by Parliamentarian forces, the Royalist army moved into Eton and attempted to retake the town, occupying the college. Efforts to retake Windsor were unsuccessful and the royalists eventually fled. In 1812, Porny's charity school was founded by the estate of the late Antoine Pyron du Martré, otherwise Mark Anthony Porny, French master at Eton College. Later named Eton Porny, it became the school for local children at 29 High Street. In 1863, moving to the school's current site at 14 High Street Eton. The population was 3,526 by 1841. The college sometimes leased small plots of land to the village as an act of charity, leading to the construction of houses near the bridge. Scholars at the college also used to collect "salt" (money) from the inns of Eton High Street.

This practice continued until 1845 when a scholar refused to associate with the inns because they were a "temptation" to Eton students. Eton was favourably modernised and was the first village in the UK to have its own post office and modern drainage system. By 1925 the town was described as more commercial than residential, with most of the buildings (apart from those of the school itself) belonging to businesses serving the schoolboys. In April 1970, Windsor Bridge, connecting Eton to Windsor, was closed to all motorised traffic. All traffic must now travel via Royal Windsor Way (formerly the Windsor and Eton relief road), a bypass opened in 1966.

== Notable people ==
In birth order:

- William Oughtred (1574–1660), mathematician and cleric
- Edmund Bristow (1787–1876), artist, was born in Eton and lived his whole life in the Windsor area
- Charles Duke Yonge (1812–1891), an English historian, classicist and cricketer
- George E. Davis (1850–1906), founding father of chemical engineering

== Governance ==
There are two tiers of local government covering Eton, at parish (town) and unitary authority level: Eton Town Council and Windsor and Maidenhead Borough Council.

At the parish level, the town is represented by seven councillors in the Eton Town Council, a body which also includes seven councillors representing Eton Wick. At the district level, the town is part of the Eton and Castle electoral ward of the Royal Borough of Windsor and Maidenhead.

Nationally, since 1997 the ward has formed part of the UK Parliamentary constituency of Windsor and is currently represented by Jack Rankin of the Conservative Party.

Between 1983 and 1997, the town was part of the UK Parliamentary constituency of Windsor and Maidenhead, which was held by the Conservative Party throughout that period. Before 1983, the town was within the boundaries of the UK Parliamentary constituency of Eton and Slough. This was held by the Labour Party from its creation in 1945 to its redistribution in 1983, except between 1964 and 1966 when it was held by a Conservative.

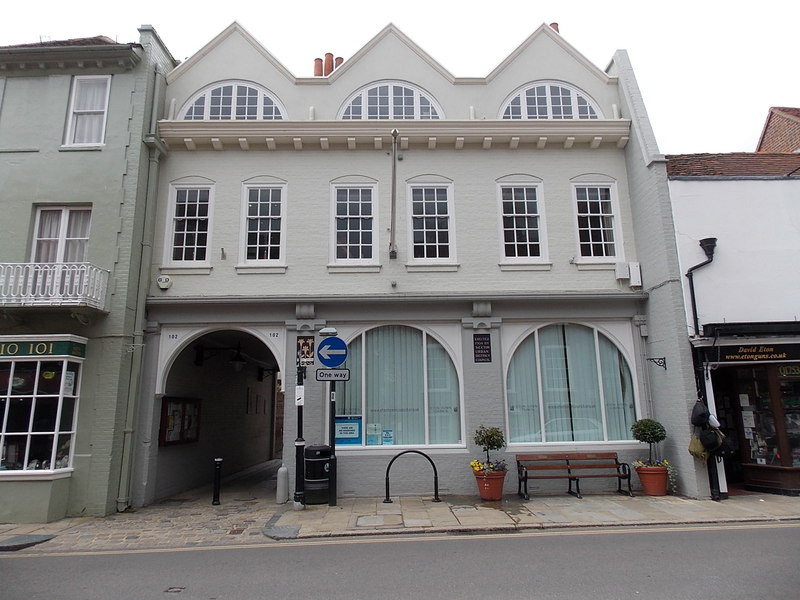
Eton Town Council Offices, 102 High Street

=== Administrative history ===
Eton was governed by a local board from 1849 to 1894, and by an urban district council from 1894 to 1974. Eton Urban District Council was abolished under the Local Government Act 1972, with the area being transferred from Buckinghamshire to Berkshire on 1 April 1974 to become part of the new district of Windsor and Maidenhead. A successor parish was created to cover the former Eton Urban District, which had covered both the town itself and Eton Wick. The parish council adopted the name Eton Town Council. It is based at 102 High Street.

== Transport ==
=== Bus ===
Eton is served by two bus companies. Thames Valley Buses operates Monday to Saturday buses on the Slough – Eton – Eton Wick – Taplow – Maidenhead route (bus 15). Redline Buses operates the Slough – Eton – Eton Wick – Dorney – Maidenhead route on Tuesdays and Fridays (bus 63/68).

=== Rail ===
Windsor has two terminal stations. Eighty metres (260 ft) southeast of Windsor Bridge, the town's historic pedestrian and cycle bridge, is Windsor & Eton Riverside, with South Western Railway trains to London Waterloo. Windsor & Eton Central is 200 m (660 ft) to the south-west, but uphill, with Great Western Railway services to Slough for connecting services to stations such as London Paddington.

== Education ==
Schools in the village include:

- Eton Porny CofE First School - Eton is in this school's catchment area
- Eton College, a boarding school founded in 1440 by Henry VI

Schools for which Eton is in the designated area for:

- Dedworth Middle School in Windsor
- St. Edward's Royal Free Ecumenical Middle School in Windsor
- Trevelyan Middle School in Windsor
- The Windsor Boys School
- The Windsor Girls School

== Nearest towns ==
- Windsor 0.5 miles (0.8 km) (via Windsor Bridge)
- Slough 2 miles (3 km)
- Staines-upon-Thames 7 miles (11 km)
- Maidenhead 7 miles (11 km)
- Reading 21 miles (34 km)
- London 21 miles (34 km)
