= Windsor and Maidenhead Borough Council elections =

Local government elections in Berkshire, England

Windsor and Maidenhead Borough Council is the local authority for the Royal Borough of Windsor and Maidenhead, which is a unitary authority in Berkshire, England. Until 1 April 1998 it was a non-metropolitan district. Elections are held every four years. Since the last boundary changes in 2019 there have been 41 councillors elected from 19 wards.

== Council elections ==
Composition of the council
Year	Conservative	Liberal Democrats (Note: Includes totals for the predecessors of the Liberal Democrats, the Liberal Party and SDP (both of which participated in the Alliance).)	Labour	Borough First	Independents & Others	Council control after election
Local government reorganisation; council established (59 seats)
1973	53	0	3	–	3	Conservative
1976	55	1	0	–	3	Conservative
1979	55	2	1	–	1	Conservative
New ward boundaries (58 seats)
1983	48	6	0	–	4	Conservative
1987	42	9	0	–	7	Conservative
1991	26	25	0	–	7	No overall control
1995	17	32	2	–	7	Liberal Democrats
Windsor and Maidenhead becomes a unitary authority
1997	22	29	0	–	7	No overall control
2000	29	21	1	–	7	No overall control
New ward boundaries (57 seats)
2003	15	34	1	–	7	Liberal Democrats
2007	36	16	0	–	5	Conservative
2011	51	1	0	–	5	Conservative
2015	54	1	0	–	2	Conservative
New ward boundaries (41 seats)
2019	23	9	0	3	6 (Note: 5 Residents, 1 Flood Prevention)	Conservative
2023	7	22	0	7	5 (Note: 4 Residents, 1 Flood Prevention)	Liberal Democrats

=== Non-metropolitan district elections ===
- 1973 Windsor and Maidenhead Borough Council election
- 1976 Windsor and Maidenhead Borough Council election
- 1979 Windsor and Maidenhead Borough Council election
- 1983 Windsor and Maidenhead Borough Council election (New ward boundaries)
- 1987 Windsor and Maidenhead Borough Council election
- 1991 Windsor and Maidenhead Borough Council election (Borough boundary changes took place but the number of seats remained the same)
- 1995 Windsor and Maidenhead Borough Council election

=== Unitary authority elections ===
- 1997 Windsor and Maidenhead Borough Council election
- 2000 Windsor and Maidenhead Borough Council election
- 2003 Windsor and Maidenhead Borough Council election (New ward boundaries reduced the number of seats by 1)
- 2007 Windsor and Maidenhead Borough Council election
- 2011 Windsor and Maidenhead Borough Council election
- 2015 Windsor and Maidenhead Borough Council election
- 2019 Windsor and Maidenhead Borough Council election (New Ward Boundaries and significant reduction in number of seats)
- 2023 Windsor and Maidenhead Borough Council election

== Borough result maps ==
2003 results map

2007 results map

2011 results map

2015 results map

2019 results map

2023 results map

== By-election results ==
=== 1997–2000 ===
Trinity By-Election 18 September 1997
Party	Candidate	Votes	%	±%
Liberal Democrats		682	51.6	−1.5
Conservative		502	38.0	+5.0
Labour		103	7.8	−3.1
Independent		25	1.9	+1.9
Independent		10	0.8	+0.8
Majority		180	13.6	
Turnout		1,322	30.0	
Liberal Democrats hold		Swing		

Oldfield By-Election 21 May 1998
Party	Candidate	Votes	%	±%
Conservative		737	46.7	+1.8
Labour		539	34.2	−0.6
Liberal Democrats		301	19.1	−1.2
Majority		198	12.5	
Turnout		1,577	26.4	
Conservative hold		Swing		

Park By-Election 4 June 1998
Party	Candidate	Votes	%	±%
Liberal Democrats		887	52.3	−4.6
Conservative		724	42.6	+7.7
Labour		88	5.2	−3.1
Majority		163	9.7	
Turnout		1,699	34.0	
Liberal Democrats hold		Swing		

Eton Wick By-Election 26 November 1998
Party	Candidate	Votes	%	±%
Labour		507	51.5	+15.3
Conservative		347	35.3	−1.2
Liberal Democrats		95	9.7	−18.2
Independent		35	3.6	+3.6
Majority		160	16.2	
Turnout		984	50.8	
Labour gain from Conservative		Swing		

Sunninghill By-Election 25 March 1999
Party	Candidate	Votes	%	±%
Conservative		821	51.2	−4.8
Liberal Democrats		783	48.8	+18.3
Majority		38	2.4	
Turnout		1,604	27.5	
Conservative hold		Swing		

=== 2000–2010 ===
Sunninghill By-Election 6 December 2001
Party	Candidate	Votes	%	±%
Conservative	David Hilton	752	51.1	−7.0
Liberal Democrats	Enid Cross	660	44.8	+2.9
Labour	Kevin Cochrane	60	4.1	+4.1
Majority		92	6.3	
Turnout		1,472		
Conservative hold		Swing		

Clewer North By-Election 3 October 2002
Party	Candidate	Votes	%	±%
Independent	Eileen Penfold	599	69.9	+9.9
Labour	Andrew Foakes	258	30.1	+10.7
Majority		341	39.8	
Turnout		857	18.1	
Independent hold		Swing		

Clewer North By-Election 31 October 2003
Party	Candidate	Votes	%	±%
Independent	John Penfold	544	42.2	+16.5
Conservative	Peter Smith	325	25.2	+13.0
Liberal Democrats	Helen Salmon	298	23.1	+15.8
Labour	Andrew Foakes	121	9.4	+2.4
Majority		219	17.0	
Turnout		1,288	22.5	
Independent hold		Swing		

Horton and Wraysbury By-Election 16 June 2005
Party	Candidate	Votes	%	±%
Conservative	Colin Rayner	595	54.4	+16.9
Independent	Ewan Larcombe	499	45.6	−11.9
Majority		96	8.8	
Turnout		1,094		
Conservative gain from Independent		Swing		

Eton Wick By-Election 22 September 2005
Party	Candidate	Votes	%	±%
Conservative	Stephen Smith	405	48.9	+11.8
Labour	Marie Wilson	250	30.1	−32.8
Independent	Peter Lawless	115	13.9	+13.9
Liberal Democrats	Moray Barclay	59	7.1	+7.1
Majority		155	18.8	
Turnout		829	49.0	
Conservative gain from Labour		Swing		

Sunninghill & South Ascot By-Election 6 April 2006
Party	Candidate	Votes	%	±%
Conservative	John Story	1,039	60.5	+12.2
Liberal Democrats	Enid Cross	679	39.5	+2.6
Majority		360	21.0	
Turnout		1,718	38.0	
Conservative hold		Swing		

Datchet By-Election 4 October 2007
Party	Candidate	Votes	%	±%
Conservative	Gary Muir	799	63.8	−8.6
Liberal Democrats	Tim O'Flynn	352	28.1	+12.0
Independent	Ewan Larcombe	102	8.1	+8.1
Majority		447	35.7	
Turnout		1,253	35.8	
Conservative hold		Swing		

=== 2011–2015 ===
Park By-Election 6 January 2011
Party	Candidate	Votes	%	±%
Conservative	Natahsha Lavender	637	64.4	+2.2
Liberal Democrats	Richard Fagence	156	15.8	−18.0
Labour	Laura Binnie	149	15.1	+11.0
Independent	Derek Prime	47	4.8	+4.8
Majority		481	48.6	
Turnout		989	27	
Conservative hold		Swing		

Eton and Castle By-Election 11 August 2011
Party	Candidate	Votes	%	±%
Liberal Democrats	George Fussey	208	47.4	+19.6
Conservative	Adam Demeter	182	41.5	−23.7
Labour	George Davidson	32	7.3	+0.3
UKIP	John-Paul Rye	17	3.9	N/A
Majority		26	5.9	
Turnout		439	27.9	−28.6
Liberal Democrats gain from Conservative		Swing	21.7	

Pinkneys Green By-Election 25 October 2012
Party	Candidate	Votes	%	±%
Liberal Democrats	Simon Werner	839	43.2	+0.2
Conservative	Catherine Hollingsworth	831	42.8	−3.3
UKIP	George Chamberlaine	152	7.8	+7.8
Labour	Patrick McDonald	121	6.2	−4.7
Majority		8	0.4	
Turnout		1,943		
Liberal Democrats gain from Conservative		Swing		

Clewer North By-Election 24 July 2014
Party	Candidate	Votes	%	±%
Independent	Wisdom da Costa	878	57.7	+57.7
Conservative	John Collins	486	31.9	−4.6
Labour	Peter Shearman	158	10.4	−3.0
Majority		392	25.8	
Turnout		1,522		
Independent hold		Swing		

Cox Green By-Election 11 December 2014
Party	Candidate	Votes	%	±%
Conservative	Ross McWilliams	738	50.7	−2.2
Liberal Democrats	Gareth Jones	315	21.6	−10.9
UKIP	Lance Carter	278	19.1	+19.1
Labour	Robert Horner	124	8.5	−1.1
Majority		423	29.1	
Turnout		1,455		
Conservative hold		Swing		

=== 2015–2019 ===
Maidenhead Riverside By-Election 10 March 2016
Party	Candidate	Votes	%	±%
Conservative	Judith Diment	916	53.4	+4.5
Liberal Democrats	Saghir Ahmed	397	23.2	+7.7
Independent	Jeff Lloyd	162	9.5	+9.5
Labour	Nigel Smith	144	8.4	−4.3
UKIP	George Chamberlaine	95	5.5	−5.8
Majority		519	30.3	
Turnout		1,714		
Conservative hold		Swing		

Sunninghill and South Ascot By-Election 23 June 2016
Party	Candidate	Votes	%	±%
Conservative	Julian Sharpe	1,443	57.2	+15.1
Labour	Spike Humphrey	601	23.8	+13.2
Liberal Democrats	Tamasin Barnbrook	264	10.5	−2.5
UKIP	Nicole Fowler	214	8.5	−1.8
Majority		842	33.4	
Turnout		2,522		
Conservative hold		Swing		

Clewer North By-Election 4 May 2017
Party	Candidate	Votes	%	±%
Independent	Wisdom da Costa	805	35.5	+1.5
Conservative	Lars Swann	784	34.6	−11.9
Liberal Democrats	Amy Tisi	405	17.9	+17.9
Labour	Michael Boyle	273	12.0	−7.5
Majority		21	0.9	
Turnout		2,267		
Independent gain from Conservative		Swing		

Datchet By-Election 22 November 2018
Party	Candidate	Votes	%	±%
Conservative	David Cannon	525	56.0	−3.0
Flood Prevention	Ewan Larcombe	223	23.8	+23.8
Labour	Deborah Foster	121	12.9	−8.5
Liberal Democrats	Tim O'Flynn	48	5.1	−14.5
Green	Christopher Moss	21	2.2	+2.2
Majority		302	0.9	
Turnout		938		
Conservative hold		Swing		

=== 2019–2023 ===
Riverside By-Election 30 October 2019
Party	Candidate	Votes	%	±%
Conservative	Gregory Jones	794	41.1	+5.7
Liberal Democrats	Kashmir Singh	566	29.3	+9.5
Borough First	Claire Stretton	428	22.1	−6.1
Labour	Sharon Bunce	70	3.6	−4.0
Green	Craig McDermott	60	3.1	−5.9
Women's Equality	Deborah Mason	16	0.8	+0.8
Majority		228	11.8	
Turnout		1,934		
Conservative hold		Swing		

=== 2023–2027 ===
Ascot and Sunninghill By-Election 17 October 2024
Party	Candidate	Votes	%	±%
Conservative	Sally Coneron	1,264	58.5	
Liberal Democrats	George Jezard	703	32.6	
Borough First	Matt Newman	118	5.5	
Labour	Nigel Hayward	74	3.4	
Majority		561	26.0	
Turnout		2,159		
Conservative hold		Swing		

Bray By-Election 24 September 2026
Party	Candidate	Votes	%	±%
Conservative	Clare Stuart-Adams	745	36.1	
Liberal Democrats	Joanna Korczak	719	34.9	
Reform	William Sennett	368	17.8	
Borough First	John Baldwin	193	9.4	
Labour	Nigel Smith	38	1.8	
Majority		26	1.3	
Turnout		2,065		
Conservative hold		Swing		
