= Pinkneys Green (ward) =

Electoral ward in Berkshire, England

- Electoral ward for the Windsor and Maidenhead Borough Council
- Pinkneys Green ward boundaries since 2019
- District: Windsor and Maidenhead
- County: Berkshire
- Major settlements: Pinkneys Green

Current electoral ward
- Created: 1983
- Councillors: 1983–2019: 3; 2019–present: 2
- ONS code: 00MENW
- GSS code: E05002369 (2003–2019); E05012509 (since 2019)

Pinkneys Green is an electoral ward in the Royal Borough of Windsor and Maidenhead. It was first used at the 1983 elections. The ward returns councillors to Windsor and Maidenhead Borough Council. It covers Pinkneys Green, Berkshire. The ward was subject to boundary revisions in 2003 and 2019. The 2019 revision reduced the number of councillors from three to two.

== Windsor and Maidenhead council elections since 2019 ==
There was a revision of ward boundaries in Windsor and Maidenhead in 2019.

=== 2023 election ===
The election took place on 4 May 2023.

2023 Windsor and Maidenhead Borough Council election: Pinkneys Green
Party	Candidate	Votes	%	±%
Liberal Democrats	Clive Baskerville	1,832	76.5	+26.2
Liberal Democrats	Simon Werner	1,819	76.0	+18.9
Conservative	Martyn Cook	355	14.8	−15.5
Conservative	Bern Guly	310	12.9	−13.4
Labour	Jane Collisson	176	7.4	+2.4
Labour	Joseph Freeman	162	6.8	+3.4
Majority				
Turnout		2,405	43.62	
Registered electors				
Liberal Democrats hold		Swing		
Liberal Democrats hold		Swing		

=== 2019 election ===
The election took place on 2 May 2019.

2019 Windsor and Maidenhead Borough Council election: Pinkneys Green
Party	Candidate	Votes	%	±%
Liberal Democrats	Simon Werner	1,507	57.1	
Liberal Democrats	Clive Baskerville	1,326	50.3	
Conservative	Marius Gilmore	799	30.3	
Conservative	Richard Pope	693	26.3	
Borough First	Charles Hollingsworth	491	18.6	
Labour	Jane Collisson	131	5.0	
Labour	Nigel Smith	90	3.4	
Turnout		2,638	47.89	
Liberal Democrats win (new boundaries)				
Liberal Democrats win (new boundaries)				

== 2003–2019 Windsor and Maidenhead council elections ==
Pinkneys Green ward boundaries from 2003 to 2019

There was a revision of ward boundaries in Windsor and Maidenhead in 2003.

=== 2015 election ===
The election took place on 7 May 2015.

2015 Windsor and Maidenhead Borough Council election: Pinkneys Green
Party	Candidate	Votes	%	±%
Liberal Democrats	Simon Werner	1,854		
Conservative	Charles Hollingsworth	1,847		
Conservative	Marius Gilmore	1,625		
Liberal Democrats	Simon Bond	1542		
Conservative	Shez Courtenay-Smith	1542		
Liberal Democrats	Clive Baskerville	1535		
UKIP	John Radley	446		
Labour	Jennifer Cooper	382		
Labour	Hilary Brodie	316		
Turnout			75.04	
Liberal Democrats hold		Swing		
Conservative gain from Liberal Democrats		Swing		
Conservative hold		Swing		

=== 2012 by-election ===
The by-election took place on 25 October 2012.

2012 Pinkneys Green by-election
Party	Candidate	Votes	%	±%
Liberal Democrats	Simon Werner	839	43.2	+0.2
Conservative	Catherine Hollingsworth	831	42.8	−3.3
UKIP	George Chamberlaine	152	7.8	+7.8
Labour	Patrick McDonald	121	6.2	−4.7
Majority		8	0.4	
Turnout		1,943		
Liberal Democrats gain from Conservative		Swing		

=== 2011 election ===
The election took place on 5 May 2011.

2011 Windsor and Maidenhead Council election: Pinkneys Green
Party	Candidate	Votes	%	±%
Conservative	Charles Hollingsworth	1,338		
Liberal Democrats	Kathy Newbound	1,248		
Conservative	Wilson Hendry	1,239		
Conservative	Alex Goude	1,234		
Liberal Democrats	Simon Werner	1,043		
Liberal Democrats	Helen Craggs	999		
Labour	Jenny Cooper	316		
Labour	Hilary Brodie	259		
Labour	Harminder Singh	228		
Total formal votes				
Informal votes		22		
Turnout			50.9	
Conservative gain from Liberal Democrats		Swing		
Liberal Democrats hold		Swing		
Conservative hold		Swing		

=== 2007 election ===
The election took place on 3 May 2007. Wilson Hendry was a Conservative councillor from 2010.

2007 Windsor and Maidenhead Council election: Pinkneys Green
Party	Candidate	Votes	%	±%
Liberal Democrats	Kathy Newbound	1,405		
Liberal Democrats	Simon Werner	1,254		
Liberal Democrats	Wilson Hendry	1,192		
Conservative	Charles Hollingsworth	1,007		
Conservative	Richard Hogg	996		
Conservative	Howard McBrien	892		
BNP	Joanne Stevens	211		
Total formal votes				
Informal votes		6		
Turnout		2,495	49.83	
Liberal Democrats hold		Swing		
Liberal Democrats hold		Swing		
Liberal Democrats hold		Swing		

=== 2003 election ===
The election took place on 1 May 2003.

2003 Windsor and Maidenhead Council election: Pinkneys Green
Party	Candidate	Votes	%	±%
Liberal Democrats	Kathy Newbound	1,480		
Liberal Democrats	Simon Werner	1,360		
Liberal Democrats	Wilson Hendry	1,341		
Conservative	Charles Hollingsworth	603		
Conservative	Brian Webster	598		
Conservative	Jacqueline Porter	581		
Labour	Margaret Horner	127		
Total formal votes				
Informal votes		2		
Turnout		2,140	38.9	
Liberal Democrats win (new boundaries)				
Liberal Democrats win (new boundaries)				
Liberal Democrats win (new boundaries)				
