= Eton and Castle (ward) =

- Electoral ward for the Windsor and Maidenhead Borough Council
- Eton and Castle ward boundaries since 2019
- District: Windsor and Maidenhead
- County: Berkshire
- Major settlements: Eton, Berkshire

Current electoral ward
- Created: 2003
- Councillors: 2003–2019: 1; 2019–present: 3
- Created from: Eton North and South, Castle, Eton West and Old Windsor
- ONS code: 00MENL
- GSS code: E05002360 (2003–2019); E05012504 (since 2019)

Eton and Castle is an electoral ward of the Royal Borough of Windsor and Maidenhead. It was first used at the 2003 elections. The ward returns councillors to Windsor and Maidenhead Borough Council. It covers Eton, Berkshire and Windsor Castle. The ward was formed in 2003 from all of Eton North and South and parts of the Castle, Eton West and Old Windsor wards. It was subject to a boundary revision in 2019 which increased the number of councillors from one to three.

== Windsor and Maidenhead council elections since 2019 ==
There was a revision of ward boundaries in Windsor and Maidenhead in 2019. The ward gained territory from Castle Without and Eton Wick and lost territory to Old Windsor.

=== 2023 election ===
2023 Windsor and Maidenhead Borough Council election: Eton and Castle
| Party | Candidate | Votes | % | ±% |
|---|---|---|---|---|
| Liberal Democrats | Julian Tisi | 1,701 | 54.6 | +32.4 |
| Liberal Democrats | Devon Davies | 1,686 | 54.2 | +28.8 |
| Liberal Democrats | Mark Wilson | 1,667 | 53.5 | +25.3 |
| Conservative | Samantha Rayner | 902 | 29.0 | −21.2 |
| Conservative | Penelope Banham | 869 | 27.9 | −17.6 |
| Conservative | Shamsul Shelim | 670 | 21.5 | −15.2 |
| Green | Michael Boyle | 416 | 13.3 | N/A |
| Green | Liam Harrison | 310 | 9.9 | N/A |
| Labour | Rick Ludovici | 285 | 9.1 | −3.7 |
| Labour | Murtaza Khan | 229 | 7.3 | −6.4 |
| Majority | | | | |
| Turnout | | 3,124 | 36.94 | |
| Registered electors | | | | |
| Liberal Democrats gain from Conservative | | Swing | | |
| Liberal Democrats gain from Conservative | | Swing | | |
| Liberal Democrats gain from Conservative | | Swing | | |

=== 2019 election ===
2019 Windsor and Maidenhead Borough Council election: Eton and Castle
| Party | Candidate | Votes | % | ±% |
|---|---|---|---|---|
| Conservative | Samantha Rayner | 1,457 | 50.2 | |
| Conservative | John Bowden | 1,319 | 45.5 | |
| Conservative | Shamsul Shelim | 1,065 | 36.7 | |
| Liberal Democrats | George Fussey | 818 | 28.2 | |
| Liberal Democrats | Devon Davies | 738 | 25.4 | |
| Liberal Democrats | Julian Tisi | 645 | 22.2 | |
| Borough First | Keith Owen | 609 | 21.0 | |
| Labour | Peter Shearman | 398 | 13.7 | |
| Labour | Riccardo Ludovici | 372 | 12.8 | |
| Labour | Angus Cameron | 370 | 12.8 | |
| Turnout | | 2,900 | 34.87 | |
| Conservative win (new boundaries) | | | | |
| Conservative win (new boundaries) | | | | |
| Conservative win (new boundaries) | | | | |

== 2003–2019 Windsor and Maidenhead council elections ==
Eton and Castle ward boundaries from 2003 to 2019

The ward was created in 2003 from all of Eton North and South and parts of the Castle, Eton West and Old Windsor wards.

=== 2015 election ===
The election took place on 7 May 2015.

2015 Windsor and Maidenhead Borough Council election: Eton and Castle
| Party | Candidate | Votes | % | ±% |
|---|---|---|---|---|
| Conservative | Malcolm Alexander | 503 | | |
| Liberal Democrats | Virginia Fussey | 460 | | |
| Turnout | | | 69.14 | |
| Conservative gain from Liberal Democrats | | Swing | 21.6 | |

=== 2011 by-election ===
The by-election took place on 11 August 2011.

2011 Eton and Castle by-election
| Party | Candidate | Votes | % | ±% |
|---|---|---|---|---|
| Liberal Democrats | George Fussey | 208 | 47.4 | +19.6 |
| Conservative | Adam Demeter | 182 | 41.5 | −23.7 |
| Labour | George Davidson | 32 | 7.3 | +0.3 |
| UKIP | John-Paul Rye | 17 | 3.9 | N/A |
| Majority | | 26 | 5.9 | |
| Turnout | | 439 | 27.9 | −28.6 |
| Liberal Democrats gain from Conservative | | Swing | 21.7 | |

=== 2011 election ===
The election took place on 5 May 2011.

2011 Windsor and Maidenhead Council election: Eton and Castle
| Party | Candidate | Votes | % | ±% |
|---|---|---|---|---|
| Conservative | Liam Maxwell | 485 | 64.1 | +11.5 |
| Liberal Democrats | George Fussey | 207 | 27.3 | −9.5 |
| Labour | George Davidson | 52 | 6.9 | −3.1 |
| Majority | | 278 | 36.7 | +20.9 |
| Total formal votes | | 744 | 98.3 | −1.1 |
| Informal votes | | 13 | 1.7 | +1.1 |
| Turnout | | 757 | 52.6 | +14.0 |
| Liberal Democrats hold | | Swing | | |

=== 2007 election ===
The election took place on 3 May 2007.

2007 Windsor and Maidenhead Council election: Eton and Castle
| Party | Candidate | Votes | % | ±% |
|---|---|---|---|---|
| Conservative | Liam Maxwell | 283 | 52.6 | +20.0 |
| Liberal Democrats | Richard Pratt | 198 | 36.8 | −19.2 |
| Labour | George Davidson | 54 | 10.0 | +2.6 |
| Majority | | 85 | 15.8 | |
| Total formal votes | | 535 | 99.4 | −0.2 |
| Informal votes | | 3 | 0.6 | +0.2 |
| Turnout | | 538 | 38.6 | +8.9 |
| Conservative gain from Liberal Democrats | | Swing | | |

=== 2003 election ===
The election took place on 1 May 2003.

2003 Windsor and Maidenhead Council election: Eton and Castle
| Party | Candidate | Votes | % | ±% |
|---|---|---|---|---|
| Liberal Democrats | Richard Pratt | 309 | 56.0 | |
| Conservative | Gwyn Collier | 180 | 32.6 | |
| Labour | Jennifer Ward | 41 | 7.4 | |
| Majority | | 129 | 23.4 | |
| Total formal votes | | 530 | 99.6 | |
| Informal votes | | 2 | 0.4 | |
| Turnout | | 532 | 29.7 | |
| Liberal Democrats win (new seat) | | | | |
