= Eton Wick (ward) =

Former Electoral Ward located in Maidenhead

- Former electoral ward for the Windsor and Maidenhead Borough Council
- Eton Wick ward boundaries from 2003 to 2019
- District: Windsor and Maidenhead
- County: Berkshire
- Electorate: 1,819 (2011)
- Major settlements: Eton Wick

Former electoral ward
- Created: 2003
- Abolished: 2019
- Councillors: 1
- Created from: Eton West
- Replaced by: Eton and Castle
- ONS code: 00MENM
- GSS code: E05002361

Eton Wick was an electoral ward in the Royal Borough of Windsor and Maidenhead from 2003 to 2019. It was first used at the 2003 elections and last used for the 2015 elections. The ward returned one councillor to Windsor and Maidenhead Borough Council. It covered Eton Wick.

== Windsor and Maidenhead council elections ==
=== 2015 election ===
The election took place on 7 May 2015.

2015 Windsor and Maidenhead Borough Council election: Eton Wick
Party	Candidate	Votes	%	±%
Conservative	Samantha Rayner	657		
Labour	Peter Shearman	358		
Independent	Peter Lawless	290		
Turnout			72.73	
Conservative gain from Independent		Swing		

=== 2011 election ===
The election took place on 5 May 2011. Peter Lawless sat as an independent councillor from 2014.

2011 Windsor and Maidenhead Borough Council election: Eton Wick
Party	Candidate	Votes	%	±%
Conservative	Peter Lawless	565	56.6	−6.7
Labour	Mark Olney	427	42.8	+32.3
Majority		138	13.8	
Total formal votes		992	99.4	−0.5
Informal votes		6	0.6	+0.5
Turnout		998	56.5	+14.9
Conservative hold		Swing		

=== 2007 election ===
The election took place on 3 May 2007.

2007 Windsor and Maidenhead Council election: Eton Wick
Party	Candidate	Votes	%	±%
Conservative	Stephen Smith	452	63.3	+14.4
UKIP	Ken Wight	109	15.3	
Liberal Democrats	Suzanne Battison	77	10.8	+3.7
Labour	Paul Crossland	75	10.5	−19.7
Majority		343	48	
Total formal votes		713	99.9	
Informal votes		1	0.1	
Turnout		714	41.56	
Conservative hold		Swing		

=== 2005 by-election ===
The by-election took place on 22 September 2005.

2005 Eton Wick by-election
Party	Candidate	Votes	%	±%
Conservative	Stephen Smith	405	48.9	+11.8
Labour	Marie Wilson	250	30.2	−32.7
Independent	Peter Lawless	115	13.9	
Liberal Democrats	Moray Barclay	59	7.1	
Majority		155	18.7	
Total formal votes		829		
Conservative gain from Labour		Swing		

=== 2003 election ===
The election took place on 1 May 2003.

2003 Windsor and Maidenhead Council election: Eton Wick
Party	Candidate	Votes	%	±%
Labour	Mark Olney	484	62.9	
Conservative	Stephen Smith	286	37.1	
Majority		198		
Total formal votes		770	98.8	
Informal votes		9	1.2	
Turnout		779	41.95	
Labour win (new seat)				
