= Castle Without (ward) =

Electoral ward in Berkshire, England

- Former electoral ward for the Windsor and Maidenhead Borough Council
- Castle Without ward boundaries from 2003 to 2019
- District: Windsor and Maidenhead
- County: Berkshire
- Electorate: 5,109 (2011)
- Major settlements: Windsor

Former electoral ward
- Created: 2003
- Abolished: 2019
- Councillors: 3
- Created from: Castle, Park and Trinity
- Replaced by: Eton and Castle and Old Windsor
- ONS code: 00MENE
- GSS code: E05002354

Castle Without was an electoral ward in the Royal Borough of Windsor and Maidenhead from 2003 to 2019. It was first used at the 2003 elections and last used for the 2015 elections. The ward returned three councillors to Windsor and Maidenhead Borough Council. It covered Windsor town centre. The ward was formed in 2003 from parts of the Castle, Park and Trinity wards. After 2019 the area has been part of the Eton and Castle and Old Windsor wards.

== Windsor and Maidenhead council elections ==
=== 2015 election ===
The election took place on 7 May 2015.

2015 Windsor and Maidenhead Borough Council election: Castle Without
| Party | Candidate | Votes | % | ±% |
|---|---|---|---|---|
| Conservative | Jack Rankin | 1,886 | | |
| Conservative | Wesley Richards | 1,856 | | |
| Conservative | Shamsul Shelim | 1,561 | | |
| Liberal Democrats | Helen Edwards | 621 | | |
| Labour | Fiona Dent | 553 | | |
| Liberal Democrats | Thomas Hinds | 501 | | |
| Labour | Michelle Boundy | 494 | | |
| Liberal Democrats | Antony Wood | 485 | | |
| Labour | Yvonne Olney | 433 | | |
| Independent | Margery Thorogood | 287 | | |
| Independent | David Eglise | 275 | | |
| Independent | Raewyn Porteous | 228 | | |
| Turnout | | | 67.89 | |
| Conservative gain from UKIP | | Swing | | |
| Conservative hold | | Swing | | |
| Conservative hold | | Swing | | |

=== 2011 election ===
The election took place on 5 May 2011. Cat Burnsall was a UKIP councillor from 2012 to 2015.

2011 Windsor and Maidenhead Borough Council election: Castle Without
| Party | Candidate | Votes | % | ±% |
|---|---|---|---|---|
| Conservative | Cat Bursnall | 1,238 | | |
| Conservative | George Bathurst | 1,155 | | |
| Conservative | Sue Evans | 1,083 | | |
| Liberal Democrats | Antony Wood | 665 | | |
| Liberal Democrats | Pat Gare | 620 | | |
| Liberal Democrats | Moray Barclay | 582 | | |
| Labour | Kate Pattinson | 346 | | |
| Green | Marc Green | 342 | | |
| Labour | Sona Olikara | 275 | | |
| Total formal votes | | | | |
| Informal votes | | 14 | | |
| Turnout | | | 46.2 | |
| Conservative hold | | Swing | | |
| Conservative hold | | Swing | | |
| Conservative hold | | Swing | | |

=== 2007 election ===
The election took place on 3 May 2007.

2007 Windsor and Maidenhead Council election: Castle Without
| Party | Candidate | Votes | % | ±% |
|---|---|---|---|---|
| Conservative | Elisabeth Barton | 936 | | |
| Conservative | Cat Bursnall | 935 | | |
| Conservative | Sue Evans | 854 | | |
| Liberal Democrats | David Eglise | 713 | | |
| Liberal Democrats | Mary Gliksten | 704 | | |
| Liberal Democrats | John Foster | 662 | | |
| Labour | Ann Matthews | 138 | | |
| Labour | Antony Matthews | 128 | | |
| Total formal votes | | | | |
| Informal votes | | 10 | | |
| Turnout | | 1,794 | 41.87 | |
| Conservative gain from Liberal Democrats | | Swing | | |
| Conservative gain from Liberal Democrats | | Swing | | |
| Conservative gain from Liberal Democrats | | Swing | | |

=== 2003 election ===
The election took place on 1 May 2003.

2003 Windsor and Maidenhead Council election: Castle Without
| Party | Candidate | Votes | % | ±% |
|---|---|---|---|---|
| Liberal Democrats | David Eglise | 962 | | |
| Liberal Democrats | Bryan Hedley | 962 | | |
| Liberal Democrats | Martin Pritchett | 959 | | |
| Conservative | George Bathurst | 444 | | |
| Conservative | Catherine Lavender | 429 | | |
| Conservative | David Coppinger | 399 | | |
| Labour | Margaret Atwell | 136 | | |
| Labour | Janet Milward | 132 | | |
| Total formal votes | | | | |
| Informal votes | | 4 | | |
| Turnout | | 1,551 | 31.4 | |
| Liberal Democrats win (new seat) | | | | |
| Liberal Democrats win (new seat) | | | | |
| Liberal Democrats win (new seat) | | | | |
