= Park (Windsor and Maidenhead ward) =

- Former electoral ward for the Windsor and Maidenhead Borough Council
- Park ward boundaries from 2003 to 2019
- District: Windsor and Maidenhead
- County: Berkshire
- Electorate: 3,702 (2011)

Former electoral ward
- Created: 1974
- Abolished: 2019
- Councillors: 1974–2003: 3; 2003–2019: 2
- Replaced by: Clewer and Dedworth East, Clewer and Dedworth West, Clewer East and Old Windsor
- GSS code: E05002368

Park was an electoral ward in the Royal Borough of Windsor and Maidenhead from 1974 to 2019. It was first used at the 1973 elections and last used for the 2015 elections. The ward returned councillors to Windsor and Maidenhead Borough Council. It covered part of Windsor, Berkshire. The ward was subject to boundary revisions in 1983 and 2003. The 2003 revision reduced the number of councillors from three to two.

== 2003–2019 Windsor and Maidenhead council elections ==
There was a revision of ward boundaries in Windsor and Maidenhead in 2003.

=== 2015 election ===
The election took place on 7 May 2015.

2015 Windsor and Maidenhead Borough Council election: Park
Party	Candidate	Votes	%	±%
Conservative	Natasha Airey	1,549		
Conservative	Phillip Bicknell	1,331		
Liberal Democrats	Amarjeet Bhamra	383		
Labour	Laura Binnie	380		
Liberal Democrats	Susan Hinds	317		
Green	Simon Beer	290		
UKIP	Peter Bishop	274		
UKIP	Nicole Fowler	206		
Independent	Jon Davey	198		
Independent	Franco De Luca	121		
Turnout			73.74	
Conservative hold		Swing		
Conservative hold		Swing		

=== 2011 election ===
The election took place on 5 May 2011.

2011 Windsor and Maidenhead Borough Council election: Park
Party	Candidate	Votes	%	±%
Conservative	Phillip Bicknell	1,076		
Conservative	Natasha Lavender	996		
Liberal Democrats	John Edwards	310		
Liberal Democrats	Julie Hartshorn	309		
Labour	Brent Curless	282		
Total formal votes				
Informal votes		9		
Turnout			46.6	
Conservative hold		Swing		
Conservative hold		Swing		

=== 2011 by-election ===
The by-election took place on 6 January 2011.

2011 Park by-election
Party	Candidate	Votes	%	±%
Conservative	Natasha Lavender	637		
Liberal Democrats	Richard Fagence	156		
Labour	Laura Binnie	149		
Independent	Derek Prime	47		
Majority		481		
Total formal votes		989		
Informal votes				
Turnout				
Conservative hold		Swing		

=== 2007 election ===
The election took place on 3 May 2007.

2007 Windsor and Maidenhead Borough Council election: Park
Party	Candidate	Votes	%	±%
Conservative	Phillip Bicknell	1,098		
Conservative	Richard Gard	1,046		
Liberal Democrats	Michael Scott	596		
Liberal Democrats	Beverley Green	575		
Labour	Brent Curless	72		
Labour	Andrew Gittens	69		
Total formal votes		3456		
Informal votes		7		
Turnout		1,781	49.28	
Conservative gain from Liberal Democrats		Swing		
Conservative gain from Liberal Democrats		Swing		

=== 2003 election ===
The election took place on 1 May 2003.

2003 Windsor and Maidenhead Borough Council election: Park
Party	Candidate	Votes	%	±%
Liberal Democrats	Michael Scott	854		
Liberal Democrats	Beverley Green	835		
Conservative	Anthony Cross	640		
Conservative	John Henson	634		
Labour	Brent Curless	77		
Labour	Annemarie Price	67		
Total formal votes		3107		
Informal votes		3		
Turnout		1,572	37.34	
Liberal Democrats win (new boundaries)				
Liberal Democrats win (new boundaries)				

== 1983–2003 Windsor and Maidenhead council elections ==
Park ward boundaries from 1983 to 2003

=== 1995 election ===
The election took place on 4 May 1995.

1995 Windsor and Maidenhead Borough Council election: Park
Party	Candidate	Votes	%	±%
Liberal Democrats	M. Scott	1,317	62.6	
Liberal Democrats	D. Lanehart	1,272		
Liberal Democrats	B. Ridge	1,218		
Conservative	S. Dixon	534	25.4	
Conservative	D. Neale	527		
Conservative	E. Wilson	485		
Labour	A. Price	254	12.1	
Labour	Y. Olney	236		
Turnout			44.0	
Liberal Democrats hold		Swing		
Liberal Democrats hold		Swing		
Liberal Democrats hold		Swing		

=== 1991 election ===
The election took place on 2 May 1991.

1991 Windsor and Maidenhead Borough Council election: Park
Party	Candidate	Votes	%	±%
Liberal Democrats	M. Scott	1,611	60.1	
Liberal Democrats	D. Lanehart	1,502		
Liberal Democrats	B. Ridge	1,470		
Conservative	M. Eatock	765	28.6	
Conservative	D. Neale	719		
Conservative	G. Fahri	683		
Labour	N. Brooker	182	6.8	
Labour	A. Price	165		
Labour	G. Story	162		
Green	C. Hyde	121	4.5	
Turnout			54.5	
Liberal Democrats gain from Conservative		Swing		
Liberal Democrats gain from Conservative		Swing		
Liberal Democrats gain from Conservative		Swing		

=== 1987 election ===
The election took place on 7 May 1987.

1987 Windsor and Maidenhead Borough Council election: Park
Party	Candidate	Votes	%	±%
Liberal	L. Cottrill	1,323	45.2	
Liberal	M. Scott	1,209		
Liberal	B. Ridge	1,054		
Conservative	R. Glyn-Jones	1,151	39.4	
Conservative	K. Hughes	1,085		
Conservative	S. Dolby	1,070		
Green	P. Gordon	259	8.9	
Labour	D. Coppell	191	6.5	
Labour	J. Rowse	157		
Labour	G. Story	152		
Turnout			60.1	
Liberal hold		Swing		
Liberal hold		Swing		
Liberal hold		Swing		

=== 1983 election ===
The election took place on 5 May 1983.

1983 Windsor and Maidenhead Borough Council election: Park
Party	Candidate	Votes	%	±%
Liberal	R. Eumorfopoulos	1,445	56.0	
Liberal	L. Cottrill	1,311		
Liberal	M. Scott	1,253		
Conservative	P. Pennington-Leigh	892	34.6	
Conservative	S. Brown	879		
Conservative	A. Moore	840		
Labour	J. Jarratt	244	9.5	
Labour	F. Bradley	200		
Labour	J. Rowse	169		
Turnout			52.8	
Liberal gain from Conservative		Swing		
Liberal gain from Conservative		Swing		
Liberal gain from Conservative		Swing		

== 1973–1983 Windsor and Maidenhead council elections ==
No. 9 (New Windsor: Park) ward boundaries from 1974 to 1983

=== 1979 election ===
The election took place on 3 May 1979.

1979 Windsor and Maidenhead Borough Council election: Park
Party	Candidate	Votes	%	±%
Conservative	T. Ackland	1,453	46.3	
Conservative	J. Lovejoy	1,401		
Conservative	R. Dyason	1,386		
Liberal	R. Eumorfopoulos	1,155	36.8	
Labour	M. Price	532	16.9	
Labour	A. Wells	413		
Labour	B. Thompson	389		
Turnout			71.8	
Conservative hold		Swing		
Conservative hold		Swing		
Conservative hold		Swing		

=== 1976 election ===
The election took place on 1 May 1976.

1976 Windsor and Maidenhead Borough Council election: Park
Party	Candidate	Votes	%	±%
Conservative	I. Harris	984	57.8	
Conservative	T. Ackland	983		
Conservative	R. Dyason	957		
Liberal	G. Hinchliffe	420	24.7	
Labour	B. Whiteley	298	17.5	
Labour	D. Newport	280		
Labour	L. Jones	272		
Turnout			41.9	
Conservative hold		Swing		
Conservative hold		Swing		
Conservative hold		Swing		

=== 1973 election ===
The election took place on 10 May 1973.

1973 Windsor and Maidenhead Borough Council election: Park
Party	Candidate	Votes	%	±%
Conservative	I. Harris	735	57.9	
Conservative	G. Ackland	726		
Conservative	R. Dyason	720		
Liberal	P. King	535	42.1	
Liberal	G. Marriott	496		
Liberal	T. Keys	445		
Turnout			32.8	
Conservative win (new seat)				
Conservative win (new seat)				
Conservative win (new seat)				
