= Joshua Reynolds (politician) =

British politician

Councillor Joshua Reynolds MP
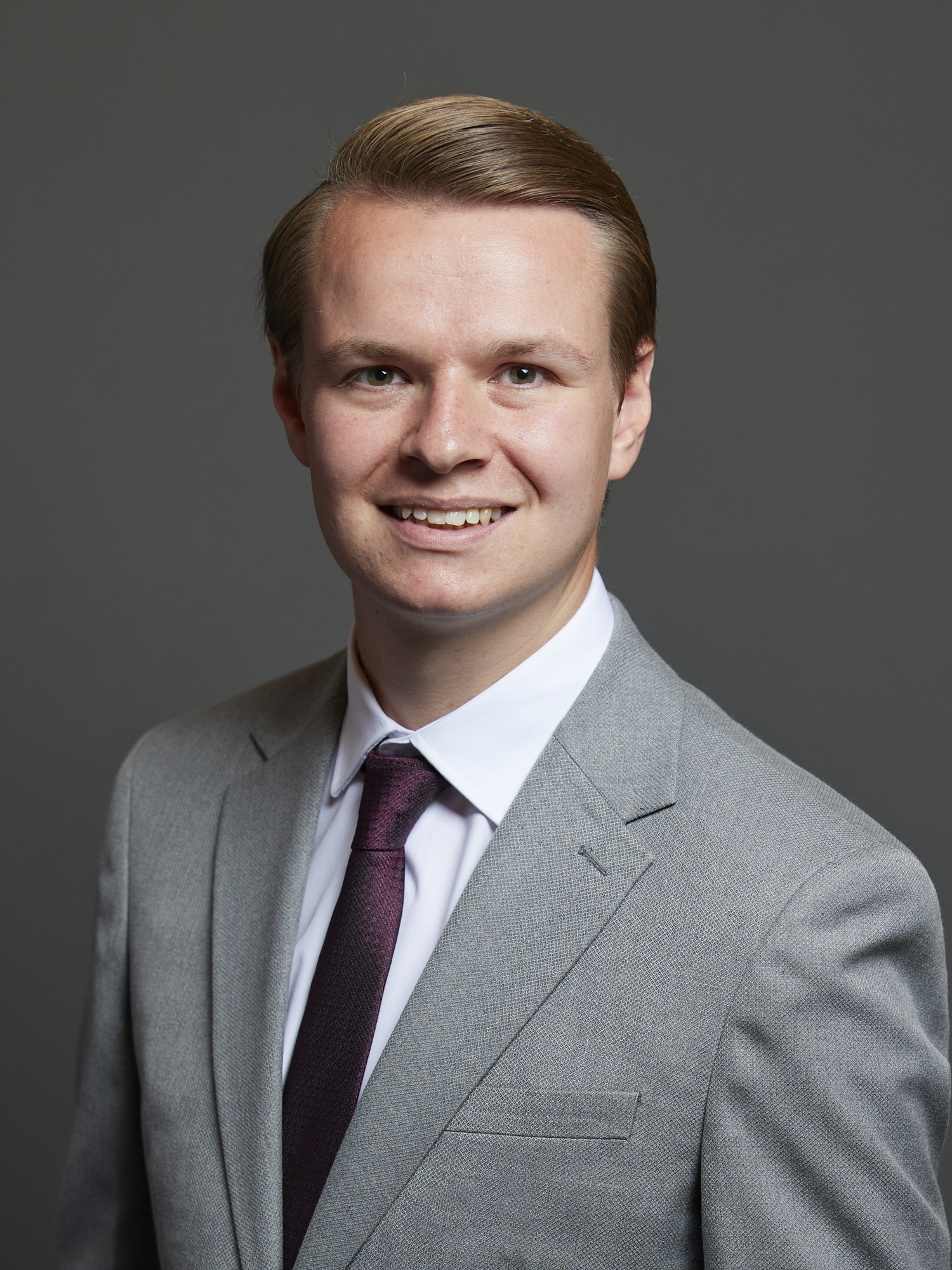
- Official portrait, 2024

Member of Parliament for Maidenhead
- Incumbent
- Assumed office 4 July 2024
- Preceded by: Theresa May
- Majority: 2,963 (5.9%)

Liberal Democrat spokesperson for Investment and Trade
- Incumbent
- Assumed office October 2025
- Leader: Ed Davey
- Preceded by: Clive Jones

Member of Windsor and Maidenhead Borough Council for Furze Platt
- Incumbent
- Assumed office 6 May 2019

Personal details
- Born: Joshua Peter Reynolds; 13 January 1999 (age 27) Maidenhead, Berkshire, England
- Party: Liberal Democrats
- Education: Cardiff Metropolitan University

Joshua Peter Reynolds (born 13 January 1999) is a British Liberal Democrat politician. He has been Member of Parliament (MP) for Maidenhead since 2024, winning the seat from the Conservative Party after former prime minister Theresa May stood down at the general election. Reynolds has been a member of Windsor and Maidenhead Borough Council since 2019.

== Early life and career ==
Born and brought up in Maidenhead, Reynolds was educated at Furze Platt Senior School and gained a degree from Cardiff Metropolitan University in business and management studies. After leaving university, he worked as a manager for The Co-operative Group.

== Political career ==
Reynolds was elected as a member of Windsor and Maidenhead Borough Council for the ward of Furze Platt at the 2019 council election. He was re-elected in 2023 and became the council's cabinet member for communities and leisure. He stepped down from the cabinet in 2024 upon his election to Parliament.

Reynolds was the Liberal Democrat candidate for the constituency of Maidenhead in the 2019 general election, coming second behind former prime minister Theresa May. He received 24.4 per cent of the vote, an increase of 13.2 per cent from 2017.

May stood down at the 2024 general election, and Reynolds became the first Liberal Democrat MP for Maidenhead, defeating the Conservative Party, which had represented the town for more than 100 years. He achieved a majority of 2,963, overturning a Conservative majority of 18,846 in 2019.

He was elected as member of the Business and Trade Select Committee on 21 October 2024.

In October 2025, Reynolds was named as the Liberal Democrats' Parliamentary Spokesperson for Investment & Trade joining the party's frontbench team aged 26.

== Personal life ==
Reynolds is married to his husband, and is one of 78 MPs who identify as LGBT+; including eight Liberal Democrats.

Parliament of the United Kingdom
| Preceded by Theresa May | Member of Parliament for Maidenhead; 2024–present | Incumbent |
