= 2023 Windsor and Maidenhead Borough Council election =

2023 UK local government election

- 4 May 2023

All 41 seats to Windsor and Maidenhead Borough Council 21 seats needed for a majority

	First party	Second party	Third party
Leader	Simon Werner	Andrew Johnson (defeated)
Party	Liberal Democrats	Conservative	Borough First
Last election	9 seats, 25.3%	23 seats, 42.8%	3 seats, 12.1%
Seats before	10 (Note: Includes one vacant seat in Belmont ward formerly held by Liberal Democrat councillor John Baldwin until his resignation in March 2023.)	22	3
Seats after	22	7	7
Seat change	▲13	▼16	▲4
	Fourth party	Fifth party	Sixth party
Party	Residents	Flood Prevention	Independent
Last election	5 seats, 6.9%	1 seat, 1.2%	1 seat, 1.3%
Seats before	4	1	1
Seats after	4 (Note: Both before and after the election there were two Residents' Associations with two councillors each: Old Windsor (2 councillors) and West Windsor (2 councillors).)	1	0
Seat change	Steady	Steady	▼1
- Result and the vote share of the top candidate in each ward
Leader before election
Andrew Johnson
Conservative
Leader after election
Simon Werner
Liberal Democrats

The 2023 Windsor and Maidenhead Borough Council election took place on 4 May 2023 to elect members of Windsor and Maidenhead Borough Council in Berkshire, England. This was on the same day as other local elections. The election saw the Liberal Democrats win a majority of the seats on the council, which had previously been under Conservative control.

== Overview ==
Windsor and Maidenhead Borough Council had been under Conservative majority control since 2007. The Conservative leader of the council was Andrew Johnson, who had been leader since 2019. Prior to the election, there were six registered political parties represented on the council (two of which were Residents' Associations) and one independent councillor. The Old Windsor Residents' Association, The Borough First Independents, and the one independent councillor had all formed a political group called the "Local Independents", led by Lynne Jones. There was one vacancy on the council immediately before the election, where a Liberal Democrat councillor for Belmont ward had resigned in March 2023.

The election saw the Liberal Democrats win 22 of the 41 seats on the council, up from 10 before the election, giving them an overall majority. The Conservatives saw their number of seats fall from 22 to 7. One of the Conservatives to lose their seat was the leader of the council, Andrew Johnson.

The Liberal Democrat leader, Simon Werner, was formally appointed leader of the council at the subsequent annual council meeting on 23 May 2023. The Conservatives appointed Maureen Hunt to be their new leader in opposition.

Before the election, the composition of the council was:

↓
22	9	9
CON	LD	IND

After the election, the composition of the council became:

↓
22	12	7
LD	OTH	CON

== Summary ==
=== Election result ===
2023 Windsor and Maidenhead Borough Council election
Party	Candidates	Seats	Gains	Losses	Net gain/loss	Seats %	Votes %	Votes	+/−
Liberal Democrats	32	22	13	0	▲13	53.7	44.6	39,208	+19.3
Conservative	41	7	0	16	▼16	17.1	29.4	25,857	-13.4
Borough First	10	7	4	0	▲4	17.1	10.0	8,832	-2.1
Residents	4	4	0	1	▼1	9.8	4.7	4,180	-2.2
Flood Prevention	1	1	0	0	Steady	2.4	1.2	1,099	0.0
Labour	26	0	0	0	Steady	0.0	6.0	5,295	-3.1
Green	6	0	0	0	Steady	0.0	1.9	1,642	+0.9
Independent	5	0	0	1	▼1	0.0	1.0	1,767	-1.3
Reform	1	0	0	0	Steady	0.0	0.1	123	New

== Ward results ==
The Statement of Persons Nominated, which details the candidates standing in each ward, was released by Windsor and Maidenhead Borough Council following the close of nominations on 5 April 2023.

=== Ascot and Sunninghill ===
Ascot & Sunninghill (3 seats)
Party	Candidate	Votes	%	±%
Conservative	Julian Sharpe*	1,257	48.6	−4.0
Conservative	John Story*	1,254	48.5	−3.5
Conservative	Asghar Majeed	993	38.4	−17.1
Liberal Democrats	Lilly Evans	979	37.9	+15.1
Liberal Democrats	Jonathan Pope	940	36.4	+19.1
Liberal Democrats	Sanjay Karia	877	33.9	+15.3
Labour	John Gripton	472	18.3	+4.0
Green	Rosemary Magill	423	16.4	N/A
Majority		14	0.5	
Turnout		2,599	30.35	
Rejected ballots		13	0.5	
Registered electors		8,563		
Conservative hold		Swing		
Conservative hold		Swing		
Conservative hold		Swing		

=== Belmont ===
Belmont (2 seats)
Party	Candidate	Votes	%	±%
Liberal Democrats	Simon Bond*	1,641	71.0	+27.6
Liberal Democrats	Siân Martin	1,585	68.6	+30.7
Conservative	Mohammed Ilyas	502	21.7	−6.7
Conservative	William Scawn	494	21.4	−5.2
Labour	Patricia Lattimer	245	10.6	−1.4
Majority		1,083	46.9	
Turnout		2,325	42.90	
Rejected ballots		15	0.6	
Registered electors		5,419		
Liberal Democrats hold		Swing		
Liberal Democrats hold		Swing		

=== Bisham and Cookham ===
Bisham & Cookham (2 seats)
Party	Candidate	Votes	%	±%
Liberal Democrats	Mandy Brar*	2,101	81.1	+25.0
Liberal Democrats	Mark Howard	1,887	72.8	+32.3
Conservative	Gerry Clark*	526	20.3	−20.6
Conservative	Tom Weiss	375	14.5	−23.1
Labour	Georgina Grouse	94	3.6	−0.9
Labour	Mel Stack	65	2.5	+0.2
Majority		1,361	52.5	
Turnout		2,598	49.77	
Rejected ballots		7	0.3	
Registered electors		5,220		
Liberal Democrats hold		Swing		
Liberal Democrats gain from Conservative		Swing		

=== Boyn Hill ===
Boyn Hill (2 seats)
Party	Candidate	Votes	%	±%
Liberal Democrats	Adam Bermange	1,466	64.7	+42.3
Liberal Democrats	George Shaw	1,383	61.0	+39.0
Conservative	Gurpreet Bhangra*	636	28.1	−17.5
Conservative	Anuj Khanna	580	25.6	−24.4
Labour	Marios Alexandrou	195	8.6	−1.7
Labour	Pat McDonald	165	7.3	+0.4
Majority		747	33.0	
Turnout		2,275	44.26	
Rejected ballots		9	0.4	
Registered electors		5,140		
Liberal Democrats gain from Conservative		Swing		
Liberal Democrats gain from Conservative		Swing		

=== Bray ===
Bray (2 seats)
Party	Candidate	Votes	%	±%
Borough First	Suzanne Cross	907	45.9	+15.6
Conservative	Leo Walters*	746	37.7	−14.7
Borough First	Glynis Crane	726	36.7	N/A
Conservative	Derek Wilson	691	35.0	−19.9
Liberal Democrats	Bruce Adams	317	16.0	−3.5
Liberal Democrats	Timothy Martin	262	13.3	+1.4
Labour	Robert White	175	8.9	+0.9
Majority		20	1.0	
Turnout		1,981	35.47	
Rejected ballots		4	0.2	
Registered electors		5,585		
Borough First gain from Conservative		Swing		
Conservative hold		Swing		

=== Clewer and Dedworth East ===
Clewer & Dedworth East (2 seats)
Party	Candidate	Votes	%	±%
Borough First	Helen Price*	1,160	69.3	+26.9
Borough First	Alison Carpenter	945	56.4	N/A
Conservative	Phillip Bicknell	371	22.1	−13.8
Conservative	Hashim Bhatti	286	17.1	−18.5
Labour	David Sanders	247	14.7	+3.0
Independent	Richard Margison	169	10.1	N/A
Majority		574	34.3	
Turnout		1,676	31.26	
Rejected ballots		1	0.1	
Registered electors		5,362		
Borough First hold		Swing		
Borough First gain from Residents		Swing		

=== Clewer and Dedworth West ===
Clewer & Dedworth West (2 seats)
Party	Candidate	Votes	%	±%
WWRA	Carole Da Costa*	778	39.8	−5.4
WWRA	Wisdom Da Costa*	759	38.8	−12.4
Independent	Edward Wilson	649	33.2	N/A
Independent	Malcolm Alexander	424	21.7	N/A
Independent	Jon Davey*	418	21.4	N/A
Conservative	Ian Haggart	299	15.3	−27.2
Conservative	Lars Swann	244	12.5	−26.5
Labour	Deborah Foster	212	10.8	+2.9
Majority		110	5.6	
Turnout		1,960	35.95	
Rejected ballots		5	0.3	
Registered electors		5,452		
WWRA hold		Swing		
WWRA hold		Swing		

=== Clewer East ===
Clewer East (2 seats)
Party	Candidate	Votes	%	±%
Liberal Democrats	Karen Davies*	1,469	77.0	+34.7
Liberal Democrats	Amy Tisi*	1,468	76.9	+33.6
Conservative	Nicola Pryer	402	21.1	−19.0
Conservative	Kaumil Shah	336	17.6	−21.6
Majority		1,066	55.9	
Turnout		1,914	37.84	
Rejected ballots		6	0.3	
Registered electors		5,058		
Liberal Democrats hold		Swing		
Liberal Democrats hold		Swing		

=== Cox Green ===
Cox Green (2 seats)
Party	Candidate	Votes	%	±%
Liberal Democrats	Chris Moriarty	1,677	69.4	+43.5
Liberal Democrats	Gary Reeves	1,597	66.1	+43.3
Conservative	Phil Haseler*	678	28.1	−24.0
Conservative	Sunil Sharma	452	18.7	−33.3
Labour	Robert Horner	129	5.3	−2.1
Labour	John Lupton	85	3.5	−2.6
Green	Simon Beer	84	3.5	N/A
Majority		919	38.0	
Turnout		2,421	44.11	
Rejected ballots		4	0.2	
Registered electors		5,489		
Liberal Democrats gain from Conservative		Swing		
Liberal Democrats gain from Conservative		Swing		

=== Datchet, Horton and Wraysbury ===
Datchet, Horton & Wraysbury (3 seats)
Party	Candidate	Votes	%	±%
Flood Prevention	Ewan Larcombe*	1,099	45.4	+4.0
Borough First	David Buckley	1,071	44.2	+17.9
Borough First	Jodie Grove	953	39.3	+8.1
Conservative	Margaret Lenton	748	30.9	−15.5
Conservative	Patrick Barr	638	26.3	−11.2
Conservative	Amit Verma	589	24.3	−6.6
Labour	Jenny Ward	394	16.3	+5.0
Labour	Peter Ward	289	11.9	+3.3
Green	Zsofia Macho	278	11.5	N/A
Liberal Democrats	Dan Boresjo	241	10.0	−2.0
Liberal Democrats	Joshua Trood	195	8.1	−2.9
Majority		205	8.5	
Turnout		2,435	30.92	
Rejected ballots		13	0.5	
Registered electors		7,874		
Flood Prevention hold		Swing		
Borough First gain from Conservative		Swing		
Borough First gain from Conservative		Swing		

=== Eton and Castle ===
Eton and Castle (3 seats)
Party	Candidate	Votes	%	±%
Liberal Democrats	Julian Tisi	1,701	54.6	+32.4
Liberal Democrats	Devon Davies	1,686	54.2	+28.8
Liberal Democrats	Mark Wilson	1,667	53.5	+25.3
Conservative	Samantha Rayner*	902	29.0	−21.2
Conservative	Penelope Banham	869	27.9	−17.6
Conservative	Shamsul Shelim*	670	21.5	−15.2
Green	Michael Boyle	416	13.3	N/A
Green	Liam Harrison	310	9.9	N/A
Labour	Rick Ludovici	285	9.1	−3.7
Labour	Murtaza Khan	229	7.3	−6.4
Majority		765	24.5	
Turnout		3,124	36.94	
Rejected ballots		7	0.2	
Registered electors		8,457		
Liberal Democrats gain from Conservative		Swing		
Liberal Democrats gain from Conservative		Swing		
Liberal Democrats gain from Conservative		Swing		

=== Furze Platt ===
Furze Platt (2 seats)
Party	Candidate	Votes	%	±%
Liberal Democrats	Catherine Del Campo*	1,582	67.1	+19.9
Liberal Democrats	Joshua Reynolds*	1,457	61.8	+20.9
Conservative	Hari Sharma	577	24.5	−0.9
Conservative	Josh Wallace	534	22.7	+0.9
Labour	George Blair	170	7.2	+0.9
Labour	Clive Lattimer	141	6.0	+1.9
Independent	Tom Easten	107	4.5	N/A
Majority		880	37.3	
Turnout		2,362	41.90	
Rejected ballots		5	0.2	
Registered electors		5,637		
Liberal Democrats hold		Swing		
Liberal Democrats hold		Swing		

=== Hurley and Walthams ===
Hurley & Walthams (2 seats)
Party	Candidate	Votes	%	±%
Liberal Democrats	George Blundell	782	48.2	+28.1
Conservative	Maureen Hunt*	765	47.2	−16.8
Liberal Democrats	Rob Castell	664	41.0	+22.6
Conservative	Andrew Johnson*	643	39.7	−11.2
Green	Craig McDermott	131	8.1	N/A
Labour	Sally Lupton	94	5.8	−4.9
Labour	Tim Langley	72	4.4	−2.3
Majority		101	6.2	
Turnout		1,628	34.06	
Rejected ballots		7	0.4	
Registered electors		4,780		
Liberal Democrats gain from Conservative		Swing		
Conservative hold		Swing		

=== Oldfield ===
Oldfield (2 seats)
Party	Candidate	Votes	%	±%
Borough First	Helen Taylor*	1,015	53.0	+12.8
Borough First	Geoffrey Hill*	992	51.8	+7.6
Conservative	Seema Goyal	731	38.2	+3.8
Conservative	Jade Jones	543	28.4	−2.0
Labour	Louise Fairlie	307	16.0	+4.0
Majority		261	13.6	
Turnout		1,924	36.21	
Rejected ballots		9	0.5	
Registered electors		5,314		
Borough First hold		Swing		
Borough First hold		Swing		

=== Old Windsor ===
Old Windsor (2 seats)
Party	Candidate	Votes	%	±%
OWRA	Lynne Jones*	1,419	79.1	+5.3
OWRA	Neil Knowles*	1,224	68.2	+4.0
Conservative	Peter Auger	274	15.3	−9.5
Labour	Roy Reeves	254	14.2	+6.7
Conservative	Colin Blackwell	250	13.9	−2.1
Majority				
Turnout		1,795	32.08	
Registered electors		5,595		
OWRA hold		Swing		
OWRA hold		Swing		

=== Pinkneys Green ===
Pinkneys Green (2 seats)
Party	Candidate	Votes	%	±%
Liberal Democrats	Clive Baskerville*	1,832	76.5	+26.2
Liberal Democrats	Simon Werner*	1,819	76.0	+18.9
Conservative	Martyn Cook	355	14.8	−15.5
Conservative	Bern Guly	310	12.9	−13.4
Labour	Jane Collisson	176	7.4	+2.4
Labour	Joseph Freeman	162	6.8	+3.4
Majority		1,464	61.2	
Turnout		2,405	43.62	
Rejected ballots		11	0.5	
Registered electors		5,513		
Liberal Democrats hold		Swing		
Liberal Democrats hold		Swing		

=== Riverside ===
Riverside (2 seats)
Party	Candidate	Votes	%	±%
Liberal Democrats	Kashmir Singh	1,622	63.0	+43.3
Liberal Democrats	Richard Coe	1,527	59.3	+38.5
Conservative	Sohaib Khan	776	30.1	−7.1
Conservative	Toni Tucker	622	24.1	−9.9
Labour	Nigel Smith	178	6.9	−1.1
Reform	Jake Collingwood	123	4.8	N/A
Majority		751	29.2	
Turnout		2,582	45.81	
Rejected ballots		6	0.2	
Registered electors		5,636		
Liberal Democrats gain from Conservative		Swing		
Liberal Democrats gain from Conservative		Swing		

=== St Mary's ===
St Mary's (2 seats)
Party	Candidate	Votes	%	±%
Liberal Democrats	Jack Douglas	1,199	65.9	+40.8
Liberal Democrats	Gurch Singh*	1,123	61.7	+43.6
Conservative	Donna Stimson*	476	26.2	−15.1
Conservative	Hillary Su	387	21.3	−18.6
Labour	Keith Nicholas	290	15.9	+2.9
Majority		647	35.6	
Turnout		1,831	35.10	
Rejected ballots		12	0.7	
Registered electors		5,216		
Liberal Democrats gain from Conservative		Swing		
Liberal Democrats gain from Conservative		Swing		

Gurch Singh had been elected as a Conservative in 2019 but had defected to the Liberal Democrats in 2020.

=== Sunningdale and Cheapside ===
Sunningdale & Cheapside (2 seats)
Party	Candidate	Votes	%	±%
Conservative	Sayonara Luxton*	736	44.9	−7.8
Conservative	Genevieve Gosling	698	42.5	−15.7
Borough First	Valerie Pike	574	35.0	−0.2
Borough First	Matt Newman	489	29.8	N/A
Liberal Democrats	Carolyn Fallon	244	14.9	−2.5
Liberal Democrats	Mariano Julia	218	13.3	−1.6
Labour	Nigel Hayward	170	10.4	+5.1
Majority		124	7.6	
Turnout		1,641	35.09	
Registered electors		4,677		
Conservative hold		Swing		
Conservative hold		Swing		

== Changes 2023–2027 ==
- July 2024: Geoff Hill, elected for the Borough First Independents in Oldfield, resigned from the party.
- August 2024: Kashmir Singh, elected as a Liberal Democrat for Riverside, joined the Labour Party.
- September 2024: Helen Taylor, elected for the Borough First Independents in Oldfield, resigned from the party.
- October 2024: Kashmir Singh left Labour to sit as an independent.
- January 2025: Helen Price (Clewer and Dedworth East), Suzanne Cross (Bray) and Jodie Grove (Datchet, Horton and Wraysbury), all elected for the Borough First Independents, left the party.
- April 2025: David Buckley, elected for the Borough First Independents in Datchet, Horton and Wraysbury, joined Reform UK.
- December 2025: Jack Douglas, Liberal Democrat councillor for St Mary's, was suspended by the Liberal Democrat group and sat as an independent; Geoff Hill then joined the Liberal Democrats, preserving the party's one-seat majority.
- January 2026: The West Windsor Residents Association was voluntarily deregistered as a political party on 26 January; its two councillors, Carole Da Costa and Wisdom Da Costa, remained on the council as independents.
- February 2026: Jack Douglas joined the Borough First Independents.
- May 2026: Carole Da Costa joined the Borough First Independents.
- July 2026: Kashmir Singh, who had been with the Borough First Independents since May 2026, resigned from the group on 15 July.
- September 2026: Suzanne Cross joined the Conservatives.

=== By-elections ===
==== Ascot and Sunninghill ====
Conservative councillor John Story stood down with immediate effect for health reasons, triggering this by-election.

Ascot and Sunninghill by-election, 17 October 2024
Party	Candidate	Votes	%	±%
Conservative	Sally Coneron	1,264	58.5	+18.4
Liberal Democrats	George Jezard	703	32.6	+1.3
Borough First	Matt Newman	118	5.5	New
Labour	Nigel Hayward	74	3.4	–11.6
Majority		561	26.0	
Turnout		2,162	24.79	–5.56
Rejected ballots		3	0.1	
Registered electors		8,719		
Conservative hold		Swing	+8.6	

==== Bray ====
The by-election was called following the death of Conservative councillor Leo Walters, who had represented Bray for more than 50 years.

Bray by-election, 24 September 2026
Party	Candidate	Votes	%	±%
Conservative	Clare Stuart-Adams	745	36.1	+1.3
Liberal Democrats	Joanna Korczak	719	34.9	+20.1
Reform	William Sennett	368	17.8	N/A
Borough First	John Baldwin	193	9.4	−32.9
Labour	Nigel Smith	38	1.3	−6.3
Majority		26	1.2	N/A
Turnout		2063	35.9	+0.4
Conservative hold		Swing		
