= 2019 Windsor and Maidenhead Borough Council election =

Local elections for Windsor and Maidenhead Council in UK

- 2 May 2019

All 41 seats to Windsor and Maidenhead Borough Council 21 seats needed for a majority
- Turnout: 38.1%

	First party	Second party	Third party
Party	Conservative	Liberal Democrats	Residents
Last election	54 seats, 58.9%	1 seat, 18.8%	2 seats, 2.0%
Seats won	23	9	5
Seat change	▼31	▲8	▲3
Popular vote	35,999	21,253	5,760
Percentage	42.8%	25.3%	6.9%
Swing	▼16.1%	▲6.5%	▲4.9%
	Fourth party	Fifth party	Sixth party
Party	Borough First	Independent	Flood Prevention
Last election	N/A	0 seats, 3.7%	0 seats, 0.4%
Seats won	3	0	1
Seat change	▲3	Steady	▲1
Popular vote	10,160	1,119	998
Percentage	12.1%	1.3%	1.2%
Swing	N/A	▼2.4%	▲0.8%
- Results of the 2019 Windsor and Maidenhead Borough Council election
Council control before election
Conservative
Council control after election
Conservative

The 2019 Windsor and Maidenhead Borough Council election took place on Thursday 2 May 2019. That was the same day as other United Kingdom local elections in order to elect members of Windsor and Maidenhead Council in Berkshire, England. The whole council was up for election.

Before the election, the composition of the council was:

- Conservative 54
- Liberal Democrat 1
- Labour 0
- Independent 2

== Background ==
The Independent Local Government Boundary Commission for England carried out an electoral review of the Royal Borough with the view to change electoral arrangements from May 2019. The Commission announced the number of councillors was to reduce and also looked into the number of wards, their names and boundaries. This reduced the number of councillors from 57 to 41.

Before the election, the composition of the council was:

↓
54	1	2
CON	LD	IND

After the election, the composition of the council became:

↓
23	9	10
CON	LD	OTH

== Summary ==
=== Election result ===
2019 Windsor and Maidenhead Borough Council election
Party	Candidates	Seats	Gains	Losses	Net gain/loss	Seats %	Votes %	Votes	+/−
Conservative	41	23	N/A	N/A	▼31	54.8	42.8	35,999	–16.1
Liberal Democrats	36	9	N/A	N/A	▲8	21.4	25.3	21,253	+6.5
Residents	5	5	N/A	N/A	▲3	11.9	6.9	5,760	+4.9
Borough First	19	3	N/A	N/A	▲3	7.1	12.1	10,160	N/A
Independent	2	0	N/A	N/A	Steady	2.4	1.3	1,119	–2.4
Flood Prevention	1	1	N/A	N/A	▲1	2.4	1.2	998	+0.8
Labour	40	0	N/A	N/A	Steady	0.0	9.1	7,666	–0.9
Green	4	0	N/A	N/A	Steady	0.0	1.1	918	–0.9
UKIP	1	0	N/A	N/A	Steady	0.0	0.2	152	–3.8

== Ward results ==
=== Ascot and Sunninghill ===
Ascot and Sunninghill (3 seats)
Party	Candidate	Votes	%	±%
Conservative	David Hilton	1,446	55.5	
Conservative	Julian Sharpe	1,372	52.6	
Conservative	John Story	1,355	52.0	
Liberal Democrats	Tamasin Barnbrook	594	22.8	
Independent	Adam Jezard	549	21.1	
Liberal Democrats	Aaron Chahal	486	18.6	
Liberal Democrats	Jonathan Pope	450	17.3	
Labour	Spike Humphrey	372	14.3	
Labour	Ian Steers	321	12.3	
Labour	Margery Thorogood	228	8.7	
Majority		761	29.2	
Turnout		2,634	31.61	
Rejected ballots		28	1.1	
Registered electors		8,332		

=== Belmont ===
Belmont (2 seats)
Party	Candidate	Votes	%	±%
Liberal Democrats	Simon Bond	959	43.4	
Liberal Democrats	John Baldwin	838	37.9	
Borough First	Richard Hemmings	649	29.4	
Conservative	Philip Love	627	28.4	
Conservative	Marion Mills	589	26.6	
Labour	Patricia Lattimer	265	12.0	
Labour	Ian Smith	216	9.8	
Majority		189	8.5	
Turnout		2,219	43.14	
Rejected ballots		8	0.4	
Registered electors		5,143		

=== Bisham and Cookham ===
Bisham and Cookham (2 seats)
Party	Candidate	Votes	%	±%
Liberal Democrats	Mandy Brar	1,321	56.1	
Conservative	Gerry Clark	963	40.9	
Liberal Democrats	Mark Howard	952	40.5	
Conservative	Bill Perry	885	37.6	
Green	Chris Moss	272	11.6	
Labour	Alexander McKendrick	106	4.5	
Labour	Geoff Cutting	54	2.3	
Majority		11	0.5	
Turnout		2,373	45.42	
Rejected ballots		20	0.8	
Registered electors		5,224		

=== Boyn Hill ===
Boyn Hill (2 seats)
Party	Candidate	Votes	%	±%
Conservative	Stuart Carroll	1,076	50.0	
Conservative	Gurpreet Bhangra	981	45.6	
Liberal Democrats	Adam Bermange	483	22.4	
Liberal Democrats	Oliver Baldwin	473	22.0	
Borough First	Andrew Hill	430	20.0	
Borough First	Nasreen Brittain	353	16.4	
Labour	Marios Alexandrou	222	10.3	
Labour	Graham Lee	148	6.9	
Majority		498	23.1	
Turnout		2,164	43.23	
Rejected ballots		11	0.5	
Registered electors		5,006		

=== Bray ===
Bray (2 seats)
Party	Candidate	Votes	%	±%
Conservative	David Coppinger	1,039	54.9	
Conservative	Leo Walters	991	52.4	
Borough First	Lee Page	573	30.3	
Liberal Democrats	Sheila Adams	368	19.5	
Liberal Democrats	Robert Acker	225	11.9	
Labour	Peter Targett	152	8.0	
Labour	Andrew Foakes	149	7.9	
Majority		418	22.1	
Turnout		1,901	33.85	
Rejected ballots		9	0.5	
Registered electors		5,616		

=== Clewer and Dedworth East ===
Clewer and Dedworth East (2 seats)
Party	Candidate	Votes	%	±%
Borough First	Helen Price	762	42.4	
WWRA	Carole da Costa	725	40.3	
Conservative	Phillip Bicknell	645	35.9	
Conservative	Michael Airey	640	35.6	
Liberal Democrats	Mark Wilson	216	12.0	
Labour	Laura Binnie	210	11.7	
Labour	Daniel Wall	182	10.1	
Majority		80	4.4	
Turnout		1,805	34.09	
Rejected ballots		7	0.4	
Registered electors		5,295		

=== Clewer and Dedworth West ===
Clewer and Dedworth West (2 seats)
Party	Candidate	Votes	%	±%
WWRA	Wisdom Da Costa	1,067	51.2	
WWRA	Jon Davey	941	45.2	
Conservative	Ed Wilson	885	42.5	
Conservative	Malcolm Alexander	811	39.0	
Labour	Deborah Foster	164	7.9	
Labour	Joe Young	150	7.2	
Majority		56	2.7	
Turnout		2,088	38.28	
Rejected ballots		6	0.3	
Registered electors		5,454		

=== Clewer East ===
Clewer East (2 seats)
Party	Candidate	Votes	%	±%
Liberal Democrats	Amy Tisi	814	43.3	
Liberal Democrats	Karen Davies	794	42.3	
Conservative	Natasha Airey	753	40.1	
Conservative	Dee Quick	736	39.2	
Green	Fintan McKeown	245	13.0	
Labour	Patrick Green	154	8.2	
Labour	Stephen McGowan	121	6.4	
Majority		41	2.2	
Turnout		1,892	37.02	
Rejected ballots		14	0.7	
Registered electors		5,111		

=== Cox Green ===
Cox Green (2 seats)
Party	Candidate	Votes	%	±%
Conservative	Phil Haseler	1,223	52.1	
Conservative	Ross McWilliams	1,219	52.0	
Liberal Democrats	Bruce Adams	608	25.9	
Liberal Democrats	Bill Black	536	22.8	
Borough First	David Marks	506	21.6	
Labour	Robert Horner	174	7.4	
Labour	Colin Greenfield	143	6.1	
Majority		611	26.0	
Turnout		2,355	42.23	
Rejected ballots		9	0.4	
Registered electors		5,576		

=== Datchet, Horton and Wraysbury ===
Datchet, Horton and Wraysbury (3 seats)
Party	Candidate	Votes	%	±%
Conservative	David Cannon	1,117	46.4	
Flood Prevention	Ewan Larcombe	998	41.4	
Conservative	Gary Muir	903	37.5	
Borough First	Margaret Lenton	751	31.2	
Conservative	Rushi Millns	745	30.9	
Borough First	David Buckley	633	26.3	
Liberal Democrats	Linda O'Flynn	288	12.0	
Labour	Jennifer Ward	271	11.3	
Labour	Mark Olney	266	11.0	
Liberal Democrats	Tim O'Flynn	265	11.0	
Liberal Democrats	Gareth Jones	218	9.1	
Labour	Peter Ward	206	8.6	
Majority		152	6.3	
Turnout		2,409	30.60	
Rejected ballots		1	0.0	
Registered electors		7,872		

=== Eton and Castle ===
Eton and Castle (3 seats)
Party	Candidate	Votes	%	±%
Conservative	Samantha Rayner	1,457	50.2	
Conservative	John Bowden	1,319	45.5	
Conservative	Shamsul Shelim	1,065	36.7	
Liberal Democrats	George Fussey	818	28.2	
Liberal Democrats	Devon Davies	738	25.4	
Liberal Democrats	Julian Tisi	645	22.2	
Borough First	Keith Owen	609	21.0	
Labour	Peter Shearman	398	13.7	
Labour	Riccardo Ludovici	372	12.8	
Labour	Angus Cameron	370	12.8	
Majority		247	8.5	
Turnout		2,933	34.87	
Rejected ballots		33	1.1	
Registered electors		8,412		

=== Furze Platt ===
Furze Platt (2 seats)
Party	Candidate	Votes	%	±%
Liberal Democrats	Catherine del Campo	1,177	47.2	
Liberal Democrats	Joshua Reynolds	1,019	40.9	
Conservative	Derek Sharp	632	25.4	
Independent	Hari Sharma	570	22.9	
Conservative	Mohammed Ilyas	543	21.8	
Borough First	Tom Easten	406	16.3	
Labour	Louise Clarke	156	6.3	
UKIP	Edmund Holliday	152	6.1	
Labour	Clive Lattimer	102	4.1	
Majority		387	15.5	
Turnout		2,495	44.23	
Rejected ballots		3	0.1	
Registered electors		5,641		

=== Hurley and Walthams ===
Hurley and Walthams (2 seats)
Party	Candidate	Votes	%	±%
Conservative	Maureen Hunt	1,033	64.0	
Conservative	Andrew Johnson	822	50.9	
Liberal Democrats	John Iles	325	20.1	
Liberal Democrats	Jenny Werner	297	18.4	
Borough First	Hasrat Ali	273	16.9	
Labour	Patrick McDonald	172	10.7	
Labour	Jessica Pocock	109	6.7	
Majority		497	30.8	
Turnout		1,615	34.08	
Rejected ballots		0	0.0	
Registered electors		4,762		

=== Oldfield ===
Oldfield (2 seats)
Party	Candidate	Votes	%	±%
Borough First	Geoffrey Hill	738	44.2	
Borough First	Helen Taylor	671	40.2	
Conservative	Derek Wilson	573	34.4	
Conservative	Joel Wheeler	507	30.4	
Liberal Democrats	Anna Bermange	223	13.4	
Labour	Tony Baker	200	12.0	
Liberal Democrats	George Shaw	185	11.1	
Labour	Rory Nosworthy	168	10.1	
Majority		98	5.9	
Turnout		1,674	33.92	
Rejected ballots		6	0.4	
Registered electors		4,935		

=== Old Windsor ===
Old Windsor (2 seats)
Party	Candidate	Votes	%	±%
OWRA	Lynne Jones	1,619	73.8	
OWRA	Neil Knowles	1,408	64.2	
Conservative	Arlene Carson	544	24.8	
Conservative	Amit Verma	352	16.0	
Labour	Roy Reeves	164	7.5	
Labour	Yvonne Olney	159	7.2	
Majority		864	39.4	
Turnout		2,201	39.73	
Rejected ballots		7	0.3	
Registered electors		5,540		

=== Pinkneys Green ===
Pinkneys Green (2 seats)
Party	Candidate	Votes	%	±%
Liberal Democrats	Simon Werner	1,507	57.1	
Liberal Democrats	Clive Baskerville	1,326	50.3	
Conservative	Marius Gilmore	799	30.3	
Conservative	Richard Pope	693	26.3	
Borough First	Charles Hollingsworth	491	18.6	
Labour	Jane Collisson	131	5.0	
Labour	Nigel Smith	90	3.4	
Majority		527	20.0	
Turnout		2,652	47.89	
Rejected ballots		14	0.5	
Registered electors		5,537		

=== Riverside ===
Riverside (2 seats)
Party	Candidate	Votes	%	±%
Conservative	Simon Dudley	851	37.2	
Conservative	Christopher Targowski	777	34.0	
Borough First	Claire Stretton	678	29.6	
Borough First	Mick Jarvis	600	26.2	
Liberal Democrats	Rob Castell	476	20.8	
Liberal Democrats	Kashmir Singh	450	19.7	
Green	Craig McDermott	215	9.4	
Labour	Sharon Bunce	182	8.0	
Labour	David Knowles-Leak	168	7.3	
Majority		99	4.3	
Turnout		2,299	41.43	
Rejected ballots		12	0.5	
Registered electors		5,549		

=== St Mary's ===
St Mary's (2 seats)
Party	Candidate	Votes	%	±%
Conservative	Donna Stimson	624	41.3	
Conservative	Gurch Singh	604	39.9	
Liberal Democrats	Helen Craggs	380	25.1	
Liberal Democrats	Andrew Hickley	274	18.1	
Borough First	Richard Wawman	233	15.4	
Borough First	Derek Philip-Xu	232	15.3	
Labour	Thomas Baker	197	13.0	
Green	John Barron	186	12.3	
Labour	Jacob Cotterill	168	11.1	
Majority		224	14.8	
Turnout		1,524	32.65	
Rejected ballots		12	0.8	
Registered electors		4,667		

=== Sunningdale and Cheapside ===
Sunningdale and Cheapside (2 seats)
Party	Candidate	Votes	%	±%
Conservative	Christine Bateson	946	58.2	
Conservative	Sayonara Luxton	857	52.7	
Borough First	Valerie Pike	572	35.2	
Liberal Democrats	Sonya Lippold	283	17.4	
Liberal Democrats	Mariano Julia	242	14.9	
Labour	Alison Carpenter	86	5.3	
Majority		285	17.5	
Turnout		1,632	35.36	
Rejected ballots		6	0.4	
Registered electors		4,616		

== Changes 2019–2023 ==
- September 2019: Council leader Simon Dudley, Conservative councillor for Riverside, resigned from the council.
- June 2020: Gurch Singh, elected as a Conservative for St Mary's, joined the Liberal Democrat group.
- February 2022: Jon Davey, elected for the West Windsor Residents Association in Clewer and Dedworth West, left the association to sit as an independent.
- March 2023: John Baldwin, Liberal Democrat councillor for Belmont, stood down with immediate effect after a party disciplinary hearing; as his term was due to end in May, the seat was left vacant.

=== By-elections ===
==== Riverside ====
The by-election was triggered by the resignation of Conservative council leader Simon Dudley, who said he wished to focus on national issues.

Riverside by-election, 30 October 2019
Party	Candidate	Votes	%	±%
Conservative	Greg Jones	794	41.1	
Liberal Democrats	Kashmir Singh	566	29.3	
Borough First	Claire Stretton	428	22.1	
Labour	Sharon Bunce	70	3.6	
Green	Craig McDermott	60	3.1	
Women's Equality	Deborah Mason	16	0.8	
Majority		228	11.8	
Conservative hold		Swing		
