= Pinkneys Green =

Village in Berkshire, England

Coordinates: 51.53°N 0.76°W

- Village
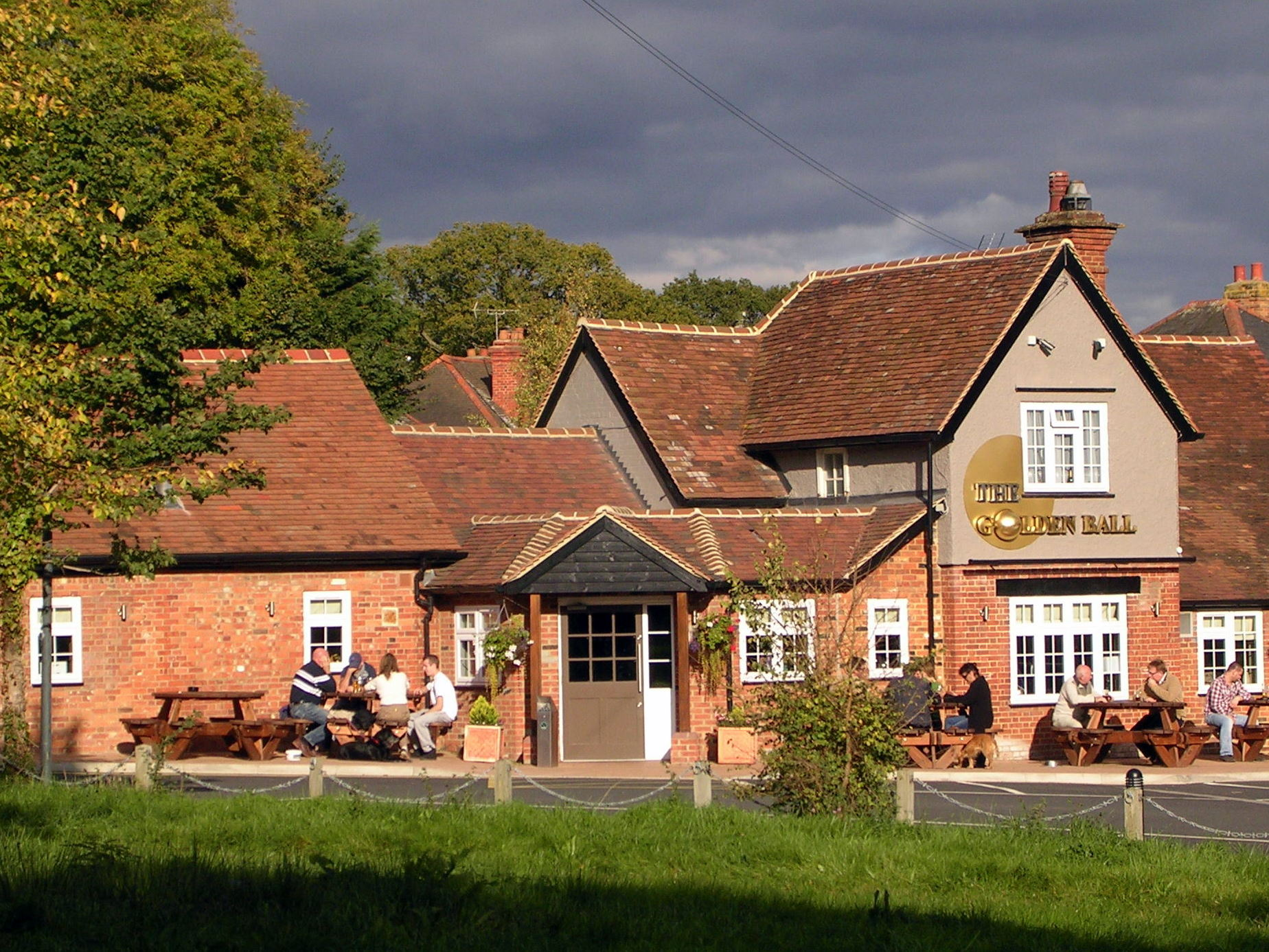
- The Golden Ball

- Location within Berkshire
- Civil parish: Cookham
- Unitary authority: Windsor and Maidenhead
- Ceremonial county: Berkshire
- Region: South East
- Country: England
- Sovereign state: United Kingdom
- Post town: MAIDENHEAD
- Postcode district: SL6
- Dialling code: 01628
- Police: Thames Valley
- Fire: Royal Berkshire
- Ambulance: South Central
- UK Parliament: Maidenhead

Pinkneys Green is a semi-rural village near the town of Maidenhead, Berkshire. It sits within the ancient parish of Cookham.

== Location ==
Pinkneys Green is about two miles northwest of Maidenhead town centre, although it is located within the boundaries of the town. The village is located east of the A404 and north-west of the suburb of Highway. Cookham Dean and Bisham are to the north, Burchett's Green and Stubbings to the west, and Cox Green to the south.

== History ==
Established as a hamlet circa 1650, it had become known as Pinkneys Green by the early 1700s, although it is unclear whether the name derives specifically from Ghilo de Pinkney, a Norman knight who supported William the Conqueror, or in reference to the Pinkney family as a whole. This prominent family, whose main estates were in Northamptonshire, owned the original manor of Pinkneys Court, then in the parish of Cookham, from the 12th to the 15th century. The wooded Maidenhead Thicket, owned by the National Trust, is at Pinkneys Green. The banks and ditches of a small Iron Age farmstead, called 'Robin Hood's Arbour' may be seen there. The Thicket was originally a much larger area of wilderness, famous as the haunt of highwaymen in the 17th and 18th centuries. Maidenhead's coaching inns grew rich on the travellers' fear of crossing the Thicket at night.

== Character and amenities ==
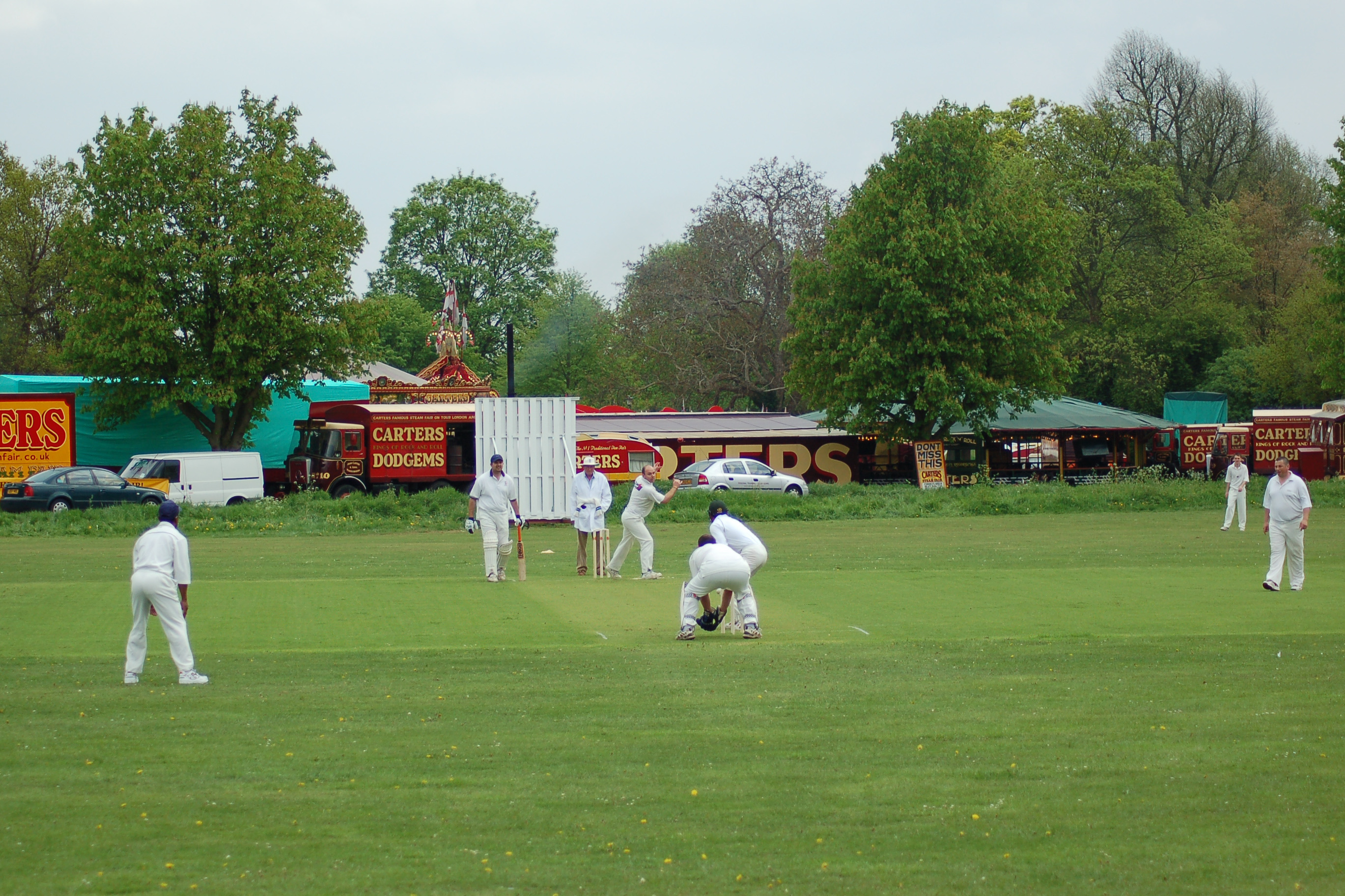
Steam and Cricket in May 2006

Pinkneys Green is a dormitory residential area and contains very few businesses or services. It has two public houses and a restaurant, and it is only a short distance from Maidenhead town centre and railway station. Pinkney's Green Common is owned by the National Trust. Carters Steam Fair used to stop at Pinkneys Green each year in the Spring, commencing an annual "road run". Scouts have been in Pinkneys Green since 1909. Pinkneys Green Scouts on Winter Hill Road has over 135 members. The first Girl Guide company in the world was the 1st Pinkneys Green Guides (Miss Baden-Powell's Own).

Ellington Morris - Maidenhead's Morris Dance team - are based in Pinkneys Green. Formed in 1972, the side practices throughout the winter at the scouts hut and perform their traditional Mummers play on Boxing day followed by dancing out from May 1 at pubs, fetes and events in the area throughout the summer. The side dances traditional Cotswold dances together with their own Ellington tradition.

== Sports ==
Cricket has been played on Pinkneys Green since 1885. Michael Parkinson officially opened the new Pinkneys Green Cricket Club pavilion in May 2007 following the destruction of the previous one in an arson attack in February 2004. Pinkneys Green F.C. was founded in 1978. The club currently plays in the Thames Valley Sunday Football League Division 2.
