= 2000 Windsor and Maidenhead Borough Council election =

2000 UK local government election

The 2000 Windsor and Maidenhead Borough Council election took place on 4 May 2000 to elect members of Windsor and Maidenhead Unitary Council in Berkshire, England. The whole council was up for election and the Liberal Democrats lost overall control of the council to no overall control.

== Election result ==
The election saw a trial of mobile polling stations in an attempt to increase turnout.

Windsor and Maidenhead local election result 2000
Party	Seats	Gains	Losses	Net gain/loss	Seats %	Votes %	Votes	+/−
Conservative	29			+9	50.0			
Liberal Democrats	21			-9	36.2			
OWRA	3			0	5.2			
West Windsor Residents' Association	3			0	5.2			
Labour	1			0	1.7			
Independent	1			0	1.7			
