= Mary Rose Gliksten =

British politician

Mary Rose Gliksten was a British Liberal Democrat politician. She was formerly Leader of the Royal Borough of Windsor and Maidenhead from 2003 to 2007, representing the Windsor (UK) Electoral Ward of Clewer East.
