= The Borough First =

Local political party in Berkshire, England

The Borough First Independents
- Abbreviation: tBfI
- Leader: Vacant
- Founded: 5 July 2018; 8 years ago
- Headquarters: Windsor, Berkshire
- Ideology: Localism
- Colours: Purple
- Windsor and Maidenhead Borough Council: 1 / 41

Website
- www.theboroughfirst.org

The Borough First Independents (tBfI) is a locally based political party in the Royal Borough of Windsor and Maidenhead in Berkshire, England. Founded in 2018, the party is represented on Windsor and Maidenhead Borough Council but does not form part of the council’s cabinet.

The party does not enforce a set of policies, instead it says its elected representatives will act based on three core values of integrity, collaboration, and respect.

== History ==
The party first contested Windsor and Maidenhead Borough Council in 2019, winning three seats.

In the 2023 borough council election, the party gained four additional seats, bringing its total representation to seven councillors. Councillor David Buckley stood for the Windsor constituency for The Borough First in the 2024 United Kingdom general election. He was the leader of the party group on the council.

In June 2024, Geoff Hill resigned as leader of the party and succeeded by Suzanne Cross. Hill later left the party. Several councillors resigned from the group during 2025.

In April 2025, former leader David Buckley left the party and joined Reform UK.

Charles Hollingsworth is the current leader of The Borough First Independents since 2025.

As of 2026, four councillors remain members of The Borough First Independents Cllr Alison Carpenter, Cllr Jack Douglas, Cllr Kashmir Singh and Cllr Carole Da Costa the group sits outside the council’s cabinet and administration.

== Elections ==
| Elections | Candidates | Seats | Gains | Losses | Net gain/loss | Seats % | Votes % | Votes | +/− |
|---|---|---|---|---|---|---|---|---|---|
| 2019 | 19 | 3 | N/A | N/A | 3 | 7.1 | 12.1 | 10,160 | N/A |
| 2023 | 10 | 7 | 4 | 0 | 4 | 17.1 | 10.0 | 8,832 | -2.1 |
