= 2011 Windsor and Maidenhead Borough Council election =

2011 UK local government election

Results of the 2011 Windsor and Maidenhead Borough Council election

Elections to Windsor and Maidenhead Borough Council were held on 5 May 2011. The whole council was up for election and the Conservative Party retained its overall control of the council. The previous election was held in 2007.

== Results ==
The results saw the Conservatives strengthen their hold on the council by gaining 15 seats from the Liberal Democrats. As a result, the Liberal Democrats were left with 1 seat, with independents and residents groups having 5.

Windsor and Maidenhead local election result 2011
Party	Seats	Gains	Losses	Net gain/loss	Seats %	Votes %	Votes	+/−
Conservative	51			+15	89.4	58.1	69,519	+5.1%
Liberal Democrats	1			-15	1.8	25.1	30,038	-10.5%
Independent	3			0	5.3	4.7	5,607	+0.2%
OWRA	2			0	3.5	1.0	1,196	-0.4%
Labour	0					9.7	11,602	+6.0%
Green	0					0.7	895	+0.7%
UKIP	0					0.1	264	-0.2%
BNP	0					0.1	142	-1.2%
Other parties	0					0.4	491	+0.4%
