= 2015 Windsor and Maidenhead Borough Council election =

2015 UK local government election

← 2011	7 May 2015	2019 →

All 57 members of Windsor and Maidenhead Borough Council 29 seats needed for a majority
	First party	Second party	Third party
Party	Conservative	OWRA	Liberal Democrats
Seats won	54	2	1
Seat change	▲8	Steady	▼2
- Results of the election

The 2015 Windsor and Maidenhead Borough Council election took place on 7 May 2015 to elect all members of the council of the Royal Borough of Windsor and Maidenhead in England. This was on the same day as other local elections and coincided with the 2015 United Kingdom general election.

== Election result ==
The election saw an eight-seat enlargement of local Conservatives' running group, having been the designation of the absolute majority of winning candidates hence governing group since 2007; the results saw four Independent (politician)s one of whom had defected in the previous term overturned, the latter in the same way as two UKIP councillors — and two Liberal Democrats lost to Conservatives. All wards of the United Kingdom in this borough consequently were served by Conservative councillors save for Old Windsor choosing its two delegates to be from Old Windsor Residents Association and three-member Pinkneys Green at the opposite end of the borough which elected one Liberal Democrat, topping the poll by seven votes ahead of two Conservatives it elected and 312 votes ahead of the runner-up. Having run the council from 1995-1997 and 2003-2007, the party's single councillor represented a record low for the party, meaning the resident's association mentioned became the formal opposition. Not elected was Ewan Larcombe who in 2011 founded the National Flood Prevention Party in Horton and Wraysbury and took his position regarding the intense 2013-2014 and dynamic of the River Thames since construction of the Jubilee River, its corollary protecting most of the borough;

Windsor and Maidenhead local election result 2015
Party	Seats	Gains	Losses	Net gain/loss	Seats %	Votes %	Votes	+/−
Conservative	54	8	0	+8	94.7	58.9	100,175	+0.8
OWRA	2	0	0	0	3.5	2.0	3,468	+1.0
Liberal Democrats	1	0	2	-2	1.8	18.9	32,070	-6.2
Labour	0	0	0	0	0.0	10.0	17,073	+0.3
UKIP	0	0	2	-2	0.0	4.0	6,777	+3.9
Independent	0	0	4	-4	0.0	3.7	6,380	-1.0
Green	0	0	0	0	0.0	2.0	3,468	+1.3
National Flood Prevention Party	0	0	0	0	0.0	0.4	743	New

== Ward results ==
Ascot and Cheapside
Party	Candidate	Votes	%	±%
Conservative	David Hilton	2,011		
Conservative	Lilly Evans	1,985		
Liberal Democrats	Tamasin Barnbrook	420		
Green	Lucas Ruzo	347		
Labour	Mark Olney	305		
Liberal Democrats	David Imperiali	301		
Turnout			74.05	

Belmont
Party	Candidate	Votes	%	±%
Conservative	Philip Love	2,107		
Conservative	Marion Mills	1,875		
Conservative	Lisa Targowska	1,627		
Liberal Democrats	Helen Craggs	914		
Liberal Democrats	Andrew Hickley	694		
Liberal Democrats	Dave Mackay	693		
Green	John Barron	668		
Labour	Ian Smith	665		
Labour	Nigel Smith	620		
UKIP	Paul De Luca	460		
Turnout			68.77	

Bisham and Cookham
Party	Candidate	Votes	%	±%
Conservative	Richard Kellaway	2,255		
Conservative	Gerry Clark	2,180		
Conservative	MJ Saunders	1,995		
Liberal Democrats	Mandy Brar	1584		
Liberal Democrats	Fiona Hewer	1044		
Liberal Democrats	Andrew Nye	793		
Labour	Jane Collisson	314		
Labour	Richard Penston	296		
Labour	Graham Lee	256		
Turnout			77.7	

Boyn Hill
Party	Candidate	Votes	%	±%
Conservative	Stuart Carroll	1,992		
Conservative	Claire Stretton	1,903		
Conservative	Paul Lion	1,901		
Liberal Democrats	Michael Holness	974		
Liberal Democrats	Norma Herdson	867		
Liberal Democrats	Robert Hill	866		
Green	Rachel Cook	683		
Labour	Louise Raffo	652		
Labour	Mark Wilson	495		
Turnout				

Bray
Party	Candidate	Votes	%	±%
Conservative	David Burbage	2,661		
Conservative	David Coppinger	2,478		
Conservative	Leo Walters	2,280		
UKIP	Tina Thomas	558		
Liberal Democrats	Sheila Adams	506		
Liberal Democrats	Mary Stockton	424		
Labour	Andrew Foakes	402		
Liberal Democrats	Rob Acker	401		
Labour	Dudley Targett	385		
Labour	Ashok Sharma	375		
Turnout				

Castle Without
Party	Candidate	Votes	%	±%
Conservative	Jack Rankin	1,886		
Conservative	Wesley Richards	1,856		
Conservative	Shamsul Shelim	1,561		
Liberal Democrats	Helen Edwards	621		
Labour	Fiona Dent	553		
Liberal Democrats	Thomas Hinds	501		
Labour	Michelle Boundy	494		
Liberal Democrats	Antony Wood	485		
Labour	Yvonne Olney	433		
Independent	Margery Thorogood	287		
Independent	David Eglise	275		
Independent	Raewyn Porteous	228		
Turnout			67.89	
Conservative gain from UKIP		Swing		

Clewer East
Party	Candidate	Votes	%	±%
Conservative	John Bowden	1,341		
Conservative	Eileen Quick	1,141		
Liberal Democrats	Andrew Clemo	591		
Liberal Democrats	Julian Tisi	504		
Labour	Janet Campbell	451		
UKIP	Simon Lowe	422		
Turnout			66.13	
Conservative gain from UKIP		Swing		

Clewer North
Party	Candidate	Votes	%	±%
Conservative	John Collins	1,712		
Conservative	Nicola Pryer	1,546		
Conservative	Hashim Bhatti	1,464		
Independent	Wisdom Da Costa	1251		
Independent	Carole Da Costa	1205		
Independent	Kevin Chapman	1100		
Labour	Antony Matthews	718		
Independent	Jennifer Wilby	398		
Independent	Terry Wilby	234		
Turnout			66.77	
Conservative gain from Independent		Swing		

Clewer South
Party	Candidate	Votes	%	±%
Conservative	Michael Airey	1,250		
Conservative	Edward Wilson	861		
UKIP	Tom Bursnall	454		
Labour	Mulle Price	410		
UKIP	Donald Sanver	296		
Liberal Democrats	Richard Fagence	272		
Liberal Democrats	John Edwards	264		
Independent	Chris Beale	189		
Turnout			62.58	

Cox Green
Party	Candidate	Votes	%	±%
Conservative	Ross McWilliams	2,170		
Conservative	Clive Bullock	2,133		
Conservative	Paul Brimacombe	2,085		
Liberal Democrats	Bruce Adams	910		
Liberal Democrats	Bill Black	835		
Liberal Democrats	Gareth Jones	725		
UKIP	Lance Carter	692		
Labour	Margaret Horner	498		
Labour	Robert Horner	455		
Labour	Elsie Neil	364		
Turnout			71.38	

Datchet
Party	Candidate	Votes	%	±%
Conservative	Jesse Grey	1,438		
Conservative	Gary Muir	1,369		
Labour	Jennifer Ward	523		
Liberal Democrats	Linda O'Flynn	478		
Liberal Democrats	Timothy O'Flynn	420		
Turnout			64.38	

Eton and Castle
Party	Candidate	Votes	%	±%
Conservative	Malcolm Alexander	503		
Liberal Democrats	Virginia Fussey	460		
Turnout			69.14	

Eton Wick
Party	Candidate	Votes	%	±%
Conservative	Samantha Rayner	657		
Labour	Peter Shearman	358		
Independent	Peter Lawless	290		
Turnout			72.73	
Conservative gain from Independent		Swing		

Furze Platt
Party	Candidate	Votes	%	±%
Conservative	Derek Sharp	1,998		
Conservative	Hari Sharma	1,845		
Conservative	Mohammed Ilyas	1,669		
Liberal Democrats	Terry Payman	957		
UKIP	David Butcher	787		
Liberal Democrats	Humaira Khan	783		
Labour	Chris Harding	750		
Liberal Democrats	Cynthia Pitteway	692		
Turnout			68.84	

Horton and Wraysbury
Party	Candidate	Votes	%	±%
Conservative	Colin Rayner	1,712		
Conservative	John Lenton	1,545		
National Flood Prevention Party	Ewan Larcombe	743		
Labour	Peter Ward	404		
Liberal Democrats	Parvis Jamieson	209		
Liberal Democrats	Peter Wilkinson	146		
Turnout			66.78	

Hurley and Walthams
Party	Candidate	Votes	%	±%
Conservative	Maureen Hunt	2,163		
Conservative	David Evans	2,143		
Conservative	Carwyn Cox	1,990		
Liberal Democrats	John Iles	544		
Labour	Patrick McDonald	484		
Labour	Jessica Bisset	453		
Liberal Democrats	Jenny Werner	404		
Labour	Sara Reeves	396		
Liberal Democrats	Jennifer Zuldt	287		
Turnout			73.01	

Maidenhead Riverside
Party	Candidate	Votes	%	±%
Conservative	Andrew Jenner	2,167		
Conservative	Simon Dudley	2,116		
Conservative	Adam Smith	1,995		
Liberal Democrats	Saghir Ahmed	685		
Liberal Democrats	Peter Newbound	653		
Liberal Democrats	Mike Keay	604		
Labour	Robert Barclay	562		
Labour	Colin Fowles	529		
Green	Craig McDermott	517		
UKIP	Nadine Wilkinson	499		
Turnout			68.33	

Oldfield
Party	Candidate	Votes	%	±%
Conservative	Geoffrey Hill	2,199		
Conservative	Derek Wilson	2,153		
Conservative	Asghar Majeed	1,995		
Labour	Louise Clarke	860		
UKIP	Edmund Holliday	785		
Labour	Geoffrey Cutting	778		
Liberal Democrats	Adam Bermange	731		
Liberal Democrats	Graham Johnstone	649		
Liberal Democrats	Derek Tyler	514		
Turnout			59.97	

Old Windsor
Party	Candidate	Votes	%	±%
OWRA	Lynne Jones	1,785		
OWRA	Malcolm Beer	1,683		
Conservative	Elizabeth Cudd	553		
Conservative	Hamish Macmillam	488		
UKIP	Lucas Crane	216		
UKIP	Bruno Haine	190		
Labour	Roy Reeves	145		
Labour	Ahamed Mashoor	136		
Turnout			73.83	

Park
Party	Candidate	Votes	%	±%
Conservative	Natasha Airey	1,549		
Conservative	Phillip Bicknell	1,331		
Liberal Democrats	Amarjeet Bhamra	383		
Labour	Laura Binnie	380		
Liberal Democrats	Susan Hinds	317		
Green	Simon Beer	290		
UKIP	Peter Bishop	274		
UKIP	Nicole Fowler	206		
Independent	Jon Davey	198		
Independent	Franco De Luca	121		
Turnout			73.74	

Pinkneys Green
Party	Candidate	Votes	%	±%
Liberal Democrats	Simon Werner	1,854		
Conservative	Charles Hollingsworth	1,847		
Conservative	Marius Gilmore	1,625		
Liberal Democrats	Simon Bond	1542		
Conservative	Shez Courtenay-Smith	1542		
Liberal Democrats	Clive Baskerville	1535		
UKIP	John Radley	446		
Labour	Jennifer Cooper	382		
Labour	Hilary Brodie	316		
Turnout			75.04	

Sunningdale
Party	Candidate	Votes	%	±%
Conservative	Christine Bateson	2,159		
Conservative	Sayonara Luxton	1,669		
Liberal Democrats	Barbara Grant-Adamson	327		
Liberal Democrats	Sonya Lippold	308		
Labour	Anne Brindle	277		
Turnout			71.66	
