= 2003 Windsor and Maidenhead Borough Council election =

2003 UK local government election

Results of the 2003 Windsor and Maidenhead Borough Council election

The 2003 Windsor and Maidenhead Borough Council election took place on 1 May 2003 to elect members of Windsor and Maidenhead Unitary Council in Berkshire, England. The whole council was up for election with boundary changes since the last election in 2000 reducing the number of seats by 1. The Liberal Democrats gained overall control of the council from no overall control.

== Campaign ==
Windsor and Maidenhead council was a top target for the Liberal Democrats in the 2003 local elections. The party had come close to taking the Maidenhead parliamentary constituency at the last general election in 2001 and were optimistic of taking control of the council. The Liberal Democrats were expected to benefit from the support of the estimated 3,000 Muslims who lived in the council area due to the party's opposition to the Iraq War. The issue of a proposed extension to a local mosque was also used for the Liberal Democrats, but the Conservatives accused them of pandering to the Muslim community.

The council had been controlled by the Conservatives since the 2000 election in an alliance with 2 of the independent councillors. However the Liberal Democrats attacked the council for having raised council tax by 9.3% in the last year and by 20% over the 3 years since the last election. They also criticised the council for its plans to demolish the town hall and pointed to a weak rating for the council by the Audit Commission. However the Conservatives said Windsor and Maidenhead's council tax was still one of the lowest in the southeast and that if the Liberal Democrats implemented the policies in their manifesto it would mean a 27% increase in council tax.

Boundary changes which reduced the number of seats by 1, meant both the Conservatives and Liberal Democrats needed 1 less seat to take control of the council. With the election important to both parties, the Conservative Party Chairman and local MP Theresa May and the Liberal Democrat leader Charles Kennedy both campaigned in the area.

The council again used a mobile polling station to go to railway stations and supermarkets in an attempt to increase turnout.

== Election result ==
The results saw the Liberal Democrats take control of the council, after gaining 13 seats. The election results were seen as giving the Liberal Democrats hope for the next general election in the Maidenhead constituency after the party won 61% of the vote in wards within the constituency against 33.6% for the Conservatives.

Windsor and Maidenhead local election result 2003
Party	Seats	Gains	Losses	Net gain/loss	Seats %	Votes %	Votes	+/−
Liberal Democrats	34			+13	59.6	49.0	46,098	
Conservative	15			-14	26.3	37.8	35,585	
Independent	5			+5	8.8	4.8	4,540	
OWRA	2			0	3.5	1.8	1,732	
Labour	1			0	1.8	6.0	5,617	
Green	0			0	0	0.5	464	
Residents	0			-5	0	0	0	

== Ward results ==
Ascot and Cheapside (2)
Party	Candidate	Votes	%	±%
Conservative	David Hilton	775		
Conservative	Peter Spooner	708		
Liberal Democrats	Jonathan Pope	229		
Liberal Democrats	Geoffrey Taylor	214		
Green	Stephen Young	120		
Turnout		2,046	30.3	

Belmont (3)
Party	Candidate	Votes	%	±%
Liberal Democrats	Michael Bruton	1,524		
Liberal Democrats	Clive Baskerville	1,406		
Liberal Democrats	David Mackay	1,364		
Conservative	Philip Love	752		
Conservative	Iain Buchanan	712		
Conservative	Asghar Majeed	638		
Labour	Patricia Shenstone	147		
Turnout		6,543	39.1	

Bisham and Cookham (3)
Party	Candidate	Votes	%	±%
Liberal Democrats	Mohinder Brar	1,196		
Liberal Democrats	David Ricardo	1,090		
Liberal Democrats	Margaret Cubley	1,000		
Conservative	Alan Jay	968		
Conservative	Michael Lawrence	964		
Conservative	Chester Denniford	936		
Labour	Judith Percival	144		
Labour	Paul Percival	105		
Turnout		6,403	40.9	

Boyn Hill (3)
Party	Candidate	Votes	%	±%
Liberal Democrats	Michael Holness	1,297		
Liberal Democrats	Margaret Hyde	1,235		
Liberal Democrats	David Howes	1,215		
Conservative	Yames Bragg	643		
Conservative	Howard McBrien	641		
Conservative	Arshad Hussain	606		
Green	Ann Hay	113		
Labour	Robert Barclay	81		
Labour	Jennifer Cooper	81		
Turnout		5,912	36.7	

Bray (3)
Party	Candidate	Votes	%	±%
Conservative	Leo Walters	1,028		
Conservative	Barry Thompson	986		
Conservative	David Burbage	982		
Liberal Democrats	Peter Janikoun	509		
Liberal Democrats	Heather Elliot	460		
Liberal Democrats	Nigel Shurben	396		
Labour	Alan Wellstead	147		
Turnout		4,508	28.4	

Castle Without (3)
Party	Candidate	Votes	%	±%
Liberal Democrats	David Eglise	962		
Liberal Democrats	Bryan Hedley	962		
Liberal Democrats	Martin Pritchett	959		
Conservative	George Bathurst	444		
Conservative	Catherine Lavender	429		
Conservative	David Coppinger	399		
Labour	Margaret Atwell	136		
Labour	Janet Milward	132		
Turnout		4,423	31.4	

Clewer East (2)
Party	Candidate	Votes	%	±%
Liberal Democrats	Mary Gliksten	655		
Liberal Democrats	Lee Hibbard	640		
Conservative	Keith Evans	553		
Conservative	Eileen Quick	541		
Labour	Andrew Gittins	120		
Turnout		2,509	38.1	

Clewer North (3)
Party	Candidate	Votes	%	±%
Independent	Cynthia Endacott	967		
Independent	Eileen Penfold	914		
Independent	Geoffrey Fido	883		
Conservative	Peter Smith	457		
Conservative	James Richards	452		
Conservative	Wesley Richards	430		
Liberal Democrats	John Foster	274		
Labour	Ann Matthews	265		
Labour	Andrew Foakes	250		
Liberal Democrats	Nicola Shurben	249		
Labour	Antony Matthews	245		
Liberal Democrats	Gary Wilson	227		
Turnout		5,613	31.6	

Clewer South (2)
Party	Candidate	Votes	%	±%
Liberal Democrats	Richard Fagence	742		
Liberal Democrats	Antony Wood	706		
Conservative	Jennifer Heaven	232		
Conservative	Victor Chukwuemeka	207		
Labour	Linda Ayres	89		
Labour	Kenneth Coles	87		
Turnout		2,063	27.6	

Cox Green (3)
Party	Candidate	Votes	%	±%
Liberal Democrats	Victoria Howes	1,332		
Liberal Democrats	Bruce Adams	1,320		
Liberal Democrats	Emrys Richards	1,295		
Conservative	Paul Digby	529		
Conservative	Maureen Mallet	493		
Conservative	Charles Horder	490		
Labour	Ian Harvey	132		
Labour	Robert Horner	121		
Labour	Mohammed Shafiq	90		
Turnout		5,802	34.3	

Datchet (2)
Party	Candidate	Votes	%	±%
Conservative	Jesse Grey	613		
Conservative	Elizabeth Hawkes	610		
Liberal Democrats	Timothy O'Flynn	438		
Independent	Ewan Larcombe	264		
Labour	Peter Ward	129		
Turnout		2,054	29.7	

Eton and Castle
Party	Candidate	Votes	%	±%
Liberal Democrats	Richard Pratt	309	58.3	
Conservative	Gwyn Collier	180	34.0	
Labour	Jennifer Ward	41	7.7	
Majority		129	24.3	
Turnout		530	29.7	

Eton Wick
Party	Candidate	Votes	%	±%
Labour	Mark Olney	484	62.9	
Conservative	Stephen Smith	286	37.1	
Majority		198	25.8	
Turnout		770	42.0	

Furze Platt (3)
Party	Candidate	Votes	%	±%
Liberal Democrats	Mary Stock	1,459		
Liberal Democrats	Cynthia Pitteway	1,411		
Liberal Democrats	Humaira Javed	1,377		
Conservative	Clifford Baker	613		
Conservative	Penelope Baker	590		
Conservative	Anthony Willis	566		
Labour	Katherine Holder	117		
Turnout		6,133	37.7	

Horton and Wraysbury (2)
Party	Candidate	Votes	%	±%
Independent	Donald Gregory	790		
Independent	Richard Bertram	722		
Conservative	Duncan Parker	516		
Conservative	David Martin	474		
Labour	Paul Rae	69		
Turnout		2,571	34.7	

Hurley and Walthams (3)
Party	Candidate	Votes	%	±%
Liberal Democrats	John Iles	1,166		
Liberal Democrats	Jeremy Hyde	1,154		
Liberal Democrats	Anthony Langdown	1,118		
Conservative	David Penfold	639		
Conservative	Philip Watss	580		
Conservative	Justin List	563		
Labour	Patrick McDonald	295		
Labour	Kelly Dale	272		
Labour	Kevin Webb	261		
Turnout		6,048	44.0	

Maidenhead Riverside (3)
Party	Candidate	Votes	%	±%
Liberal Democrats	Pamela Proctor	1,374		
Liberal Democrats	Peter Herlinger	1,341		
Liberal Democrats	Alison Napier	1,294		
Conservative	Andrew Jenner	877		
Conservative	Catherine Hollingsworth	784		
Conservative	Jennifer Spear	723		
Labour	Pamela Kennedy	117		
Green	Craig McDermott	86		
Turnout		6,596	41.8	

Oldfield (3)
Party	Candidate	Votes	%	±%
Conservative	Derek Wilson	729		
Conservative	Dorothy Kemp	725		
Conservative	Gillian Moore	713		
Liberal Democrats	Barbara Dorrington	640		
Liberal Democrats	Michael Bartley	622		
Liberal Democrats	Robert Hill	608		
Labour	Kathleen Cutting	293		
Labour	Anthony Randall	217		
Labour	Nigel Smith	193		
Turnout		4,740	28.3	

Old Windsor (2)
Party	Candidate	Votes	%	±%
OWRA	Malcolm Beer	906		
OWRA	Eric Wiles	826		
Conservative	Christopher Hawkes	173		
Conservative	James Belsey	161		
Labour	Roy Reeves	125		
Labour	Ahamed Mashoor	103		
Turnout		2,294	30.5	

Park (2)
Party	Candidate	Votes	%	±%
Liberal Democrats	Michael Scott	854		
Liberal Democrats	Beverley Green	835		
Conservative	Anthony Cross	640		
Conservative	John Henson	634		
Labour	Brent Curless	77		
Labour	Annemarie Price	67		
Turnout		3,107	37.3	

Pinkneys Green (3)
Party	Candidate	Votes	%	±%
Liberal Democrats	Kathryn Newbound	1,480		
Liberal Democrats	Simon Werner	1,360		
Liberal Democrats	Wilson Hendry	1,341		
Conservative	Charles Hollingsworth	603		
Conservative	Brian Webster	598		
Conservative	Jacqueline Porter	581		
Labour	Margaret Horner	127		
Turnout		6,090	38.9	

Sunningdale (2)
Party	Candidate	Votes	%	±%
Conservative	Christine Bateson	858		
Conservative	John Webb	847		
Liberal Democrats	Elizabeth Herbert-Brown	212		
Liberal Democrats	Peter Cross	185		
Labour	Kevin Cochrane	122		
Turnout		2,224	31.8	

Sunninghill and South Ascot (3)
Party	Candidate	Votes	%	±%
Conservative	Brian Birkhead	914		
Conservative	Alison Knight	904		
Conservative	Lynda Yong	896		
Liberal Democrats	Enid Cross	698		
Liberal Democrats	Charmian Hopkins	686		
Liberal Democrats	Christopher Bushill	678		
Green	Stephen Shaw	145		
Labour	Elizabeth Yates	136		
Turnout		5,057	34.4	
