= 2007 Windsor and Maidenhead Borough Council election =

2007 UK local government election

Results of the 2007 Windsor and Maidenhead Borough Council election

The 2007 Windsor and Maidenhead Borough Council election took place on 3 May 2007 to elect members of Windsor and Maidenhead Unitary Council in Berkshire, England. The whole council was up for election and the Conservative Party gained overall control of the council from the Liberal Democrats.

== Election results ==
The results saw the Conservatives gain control of the council from the Liberal Democrats after gaining 19 seats, 18 of them from the Liberal Democrats. This meant the Conservatives held 36 seats, compared to 16 for the Liberal Democrats. Among the Liberal Democrats who were defeated was the leader of the council, Mary Rose Gliksten, who was defeated in Castle Without ward. Meanwhile, the British National Party, who were standing 4 candidates for the council for the first time, failed to win any seats, but won more votes than the Labour Party in the wards they were contesting.

Windsor and Maidenhead local election result 2007
Party	Seats	Gains	Losses	Net gain/loss	Seats %	Votes %	Votes	+/−
Conservative	36	19	0	+19	63.2	53.0	55,333	+15.2
Liberal Democrats	16	0	18	-18	28.1	35.6	37,178	-13.4
Independent	3	0	1	-1	5.3	4.5	4,739	-0.3
OWRA	2	0	0	0	3.5	1.4	1,491	-0.4
Labour	0	0	0	0	0.0	3.7	3,866	-2.3
BNP	0	0	0	0	0.0	1.3	1,340	+1.3
UKIP	0	0	0	0	0.0	0.4	449	+0.4

== Ward results ==
Ascot and Cheapside (2)
Party	Candidate	Votes	%	±%
Conservative	David Hilton	1,087		
Conservative	Duncan McBride	969		
Liberal Democrats	Hirak Chakravarty	245		
Liberal Democrats	Peter Watts	216		
UKIP	Murray Barter	175		
Turnout		2,692	39.2	+8.9
Conservative hold		Swing		
Conservative hold		Swing		

Belmont (3)
Party	Candidate	Votes	%	±%
Liberal Democrats	Clive Baskerville	1,224		
Liberal Democrats	David Mackay	1,147		
Liberal Democrats	Rajiv Chelani	1,133		
Conservative	Philip Love	1,060		
Conservative	Marion Mills	1,005		
Conservative	Susan Kindeleit	986		
Labour	Jennifer Cooper	175		
UKIP	Richard Wells	165		
Labour	Elaine Percival	129		
Turnout		7,024	46.4	+7.3
Liberal Democrats hold		Swing		
Liberal Democrats hold		Swing		
Liberal Democrats hold		Swing		

Bisham and Cookham (3)
Party	Candidate	Votes	%	±%
Conservative	Richard Kellaway	1,361		
Conservative	John Stretton	1,339		
Conservative	MJ Saunders	1,288		
Liberal Democrats	Mandy Brar	1,226		
Liberal Democrats	David Ricardo	1,019		
Liberal Democrats	Margaret Cubley	970		
Labour	Paul Percival	135		
Turnout		7,338	50.6	+9.7
Conservative gain from Liberal Democrats		Swing		
Conservative gain from Liberal Democrats		Swing		
Conservative gain from Liberal Democrats		Swing		

Boyn Hill (3)
Party	Candidate	Votes	%	±%
Liberal Democrats	Mike Holness	1,192		
Liberal Democrats	Norma Herdson	1,109		
Conservative	Christian Harris	1,090		
Conservative	Paul Lion	1,081		
Conservative	Gillian Moore	1,045		
Liberal Democrats	David Howes	1,033		
Labour	Robert Barclay	184		
Turnout		6,734	48.3	+11.6
Liberal Democrats hold		Swing		
Liberal Democrats hold		Swing		
Conservative gain from Liberal Democrats		Swing		

Bray (3)
Party	Candidate	Votes	%	±%
Conservative	David Burbage	1,391		
Conservative	Leo Walters	1,390		
Conservative	Barry Thompson	1,380		
Liberal Democrats	Peter Janikoun	413		
Liberal Democrats	Mike Singh	412		
Liberal Democrats	Nick Bagri	383		
Turnout		5,369	36.6	+8.2
Conservative hold		Swing		
Conservative hold		Swing		
Conservative hold		Swing		

Castle Without (3)
Party	Candidate	Votes	%	±%
Conservative	Elisabeth Barton	936		
Conservative	Catherine Batchelor	935		
Conservative	Sue Evans	854		
Liberal Democrats	David Eglise	713		
Liberal Democrats	Mary Gliksten	704		
Liberal Democrats	John Foster	662		
Labour	Ann Matthews	138		
Labour	Antony Matthews	128		
Turnout		5,070	41.9	+10.5
Conservative gain from Liberal Democrats		Swing		
Conservative gain from Liberal Democrats		Swing		
Conservative gain from Liberal Democrats		Swing		

Clewer East (2)
Party	Candidate	Votes	%	±%
Conservative	Eileen Quick	912		
Conservative	Tom Bursnall	898		
Liberal Democrats	Lee Hibbard	579		
Liberal Democrats	Susan Thompson	578		
Labour	Janet Milward	90		
Labour	Susan Denegri	85		
Turnout		3,142	47.5	+9.4
Conservative gain from Liberal Democrats		Swing		
Conservative gain from Liberal Democrats		Swing		

Clewer North (3)
Party	Candidate	Votes	%	±%
Independent	Cynthia Endacott	1,216		
Independent	John Penfold	1,085		
Independent	John Fido	1,040		
Conservative	Peter Smith	645		
Conservative	Peter Bellini	630		
Conservative	Vivian Falzon	600		
BNP	Paul Hanson	402		
BNP	Matthew Tait	336		
Labour	Linda Ayres	233		
Labour	Marc Green	221		
Turnout		6,408	44.0	+12.4
Independent hold		Swing		
Independent hold		Swing		
Independent hold		Swing		

Clewer South (2)
Party	Candidate	Votes	%	±%
Conservative	James Evans	784		
Conservative	Simon Meadowcroft	744		
Liberal Democrats	Richard Fagence	522		
Liberal Democrats	Antony Wood	506		
Labour	Eddie Bell	127		
Labour	Kenneth Coles	122		
Turnout		2,805	40.3	+12.7
Conservative gain from Liberal Democrats		Swing		
Conservative gain from Liberal Democrats		Swing		

Cox Green (3)
Party	Candidate	Votes	%	±%
Liberal Democrats	Vicky Howes	1,019		
Liberal Democrats	Bruce Adams	1,000		
Liberal Democrats	Emrys Richards	966		
Conservative	Jo Close	905		
Conservative	George Bathurst	778		
Conservative	Anthony Cross	742		
BNP	John Coombes	391		
Labour	Ian Harvey	144		
Labour	Robert Horner	122		
Labour	Judith Percival	115		
Turnout		6,182	40.8	+6.5
Liberal Democrats hold		Swing		
Liberal Democrats hold		Swing		
Liberal Democrats hold		Swing		

Datchet (2)
Party	Candidate	Votes	%	±%
Conservative	Jesse Grey	948		
Conservative	Elizabeth Hawkes	906		
Liberal Democrats	Moray Barclay	211		
Liberal Democrats	Bryan Hedley	187		
Labour	Jenny Ward	150		
Labour	Peter Ward	110		
Turnout		2,512	37.8	+8.1
Conservative hold		Swing		
Conservative hold		Swing		

Eton and Castle
Party	Candidate	Votes	%	±%
Conservative	Liam Maxwell	283	52.9	+18.9
Liberal Democrats	Richard Pratt	198	37.0	−21.3
Labour	George Davidson	54	10.1	+2.4
Majority		85	15.9	
Turnout		535	38.6	+8.9
Conservative gain from Liberal Democrats		Swing		

Eton Wick
Party	Candidate	Votes	%	±%
Conservative	Stephen Smith	452	63.4	+26.3
UKIP	Ken Wight	109	15.3	+15.3
Liberal Democrats	Suzanne Battison	77	10.8	+10.8
Labour	Paul Crossland	75	10.5	−52.4
Majority		343	48.1	
Turnout		713	41.6	−0.4
Conservative gain from Labour		Swing		

Furze Platt (3)
Party	Candidate	Votes	%	±%
Liberal Democrats	Mary Stock	1,192		
Liberal Democrats	Humaira Javed	1,132		
Liberal Democrats	Cynthia Pitteway	1,113		
Conservative	Clifford Baker	863		
Conservative	Susan Maskell	826		
Conservative	Penny Baker	775		
Turnout		5,901	42.7	+5.0
Liberal Democrats hold		Swing		
Liberal Democrats hold		Swing		
Liberal Democrats hold		Swing		

Horton and Wraysbury (2)
Party	Candidate	Votes	%	±%
Conservative	Colin Rayner	1,303		
Conservative	John Lenton	1,201		
Independent	Ewan Larcombe	410		
Liberal Democrats	Matthew Jackson	92		
Liberal Democrats	Martin Pritchett	66		
Turnout		3,072	44.0	+9.3
Conservative hold		Swing		
Conservative gain from Independent		Swing		

Hurley and Walthams (3)
Party	Candidate	Votes	%	±%
Conservative	Maureen Hunt	1,096		
Conservative	Paul Etherington	1,029		
Conservative	Hazel Wilson	928		
Liberal Democrats	John Iles	842		
Liberal Democrats	John Addiscott	768		
Liberal Democrats	Joseph Mullen	732		
Labour	Patrick McDonald	207		
Turnout		5,602	45.5	+1.5
Conservative gain from Liberal Democrats		Swing		
Conservative gain from Liberal Democrats		Swing		
Conservative gain from Liberal Democrats		Swing		

Maidenhead Riverside (3)
Party	Candidate	Votes	%	±%
Liberal Democrats	Pam Proctor	1,094		
Liberal Democrats	Alison Napier	1,066		
Conservative	Simon Dudley	1,048		
Conservative	Mohammed Ilyas	998		
Conservative	Tom Denniford	990		
Liberal Democrats	Julian Tisi	851		
Independent	Andrew Jenner	448		
Independent	Claire Huntley	270		
Independent	Helen Hyman	270		
Labour	Pamela Kennedy	126		
Labour	Mohammed Shafiq	73		
Turnout		7,234	49.7	+7.9
Liberal Democrats hold		Swing		
Liberal Democrats hold		Swing		
Conservative gain from Liberal Democrats		Swing		

Oldfield (3)
Party	Candidate	Votes	%	±%
Conservative	Derek Wilson	1,197		
Conservative	Dorothy Kemp	1,186		
Conservative	Asghar Majeed	1,113		
Liberal Democrats	Margaret Hyde	642		
Liberal Democrats	Gail Dorrington	611		
Liberal Democrats	Tony Langdown	539		
Labour	Kathleen Cutting	186		
Labour	Nigel Smith	135		
Turnout		5,609	38.3	+10.0
Conservative hold		Swing		
Conservative hold		Swing		
Conservative hold		Swing		

Old Windsor (2)
Party	Candidate	Votes	%	±%
OWRA	Malcolm Beer	783		
OWRA	Eric Wiles	708		
Conservative	Allen Cottee	442		
Conservative	Christopher Hawkes	396		
Labour	Roy Reeves	109		
Labour	Ahamedlebbe Mashoor	90		
Turnout		2,528	35.1	+4.6
OWRA hold		Swing		
OWRA hold		Swing		

Park (2)
Party	Candidate	Votes	%	±%
Conservative	Philip Bicknell	1,098		
Conservative	Richard Gard	1,046		
Liberal Democrats	Michael Scott	596		
Liberal Democrats	Beverley Green	575		
Labour	Brent Curless	72		
Labour	Andrew Gittens	69		
Turnout		3,456	49.3	+12.0
Conservative gain from Liberal Democrats		Swing		
Conservative gain from Liberal Democrats		Swing		

Pinkneys Green (3)
Party	Candidate	Votes	%	±%
Liberal Democrats	Kathy Newbound	1,405		
Liberal Democrats	Simon Werner	1,254		
Liberal Democrats	Wilson Hendry	1,192		
Conservative	Charles Hollingsworth	1,007		
Conservative	Richard Hogg	996		
Conservative	Howard McBrien	892		
BNP	Joanne Stevens	211		
Turnout		6,957	49.8	+10.9
Liberal Democrats hold		Swing		
Liberal Democrats hold		Swing		
Liberal Democrats hold		Swing		

Sunningdale (2)
Party	Candidate	Votes	%	±%
Conservative	Christine Bateson	1,183		
Conservative	Sayonara Luxton	1,090		
Liberal Democrats	Gary Wilson	173		
Liberal Democrats	Heather Elliot	161		
Labour	Ajay Nehra	99		
Turnout		2,706	39.4	+7.6
Conservative hold		Swing		
Conservative hold		Swing		

Sunninghill and South Ascot (3)
Party	Candidate	Votes	%	±%
Conservative	Alison Knight	1,076		
Conservative	John Story	1,072		
Conservative	Lynda Yong	1,058		
Liberal Democrats	Enid Cross	542		
Liberal Democrats	Barbara Grant-Adamson	455		
Liberal Democrats	Jonathan Pope	441		
Labour	Elizabeth Yates	163		
Turnout		4,807	37.2	+2.8
Conservative hold		Swing		
Conservative hold		Swing		
Conservative hold		Swing		
