= Windsor and Maidenhead Borough Council =

English local authority in Berkshire

- Coat of arms

- Council logo

Type
- Type: Unitary authority

History
- Founded: 1 April 1974

Leadership
- Mayor: Sian Martin, Liberal Democrat since 12 May 2026
- Leader: Simon Werner, Liberal Democrat since 23 May 2023
- Chief Executive: Stephen Evans since April 2023

Structure
- Seats: 41 councillors
- Political groups: Administration (28) Liberal Democrats (21) Local Independents Group (7) Old Windsor RA (2) Independent (5) Opposition (13) Conservative (7) Independent Alliance (5) West Windsor RA (2) Borough First (1) Flood Prevention (1) Independent (1) Reform (1)
- Length of term: 4 years
- Salary: No salary, but an annual taxable basic allowance of £9,075

Elections
- Voting system: Plurality-at-large
- Last election: 4 May 2023
- Next election: 6 May 2027

Meeting place
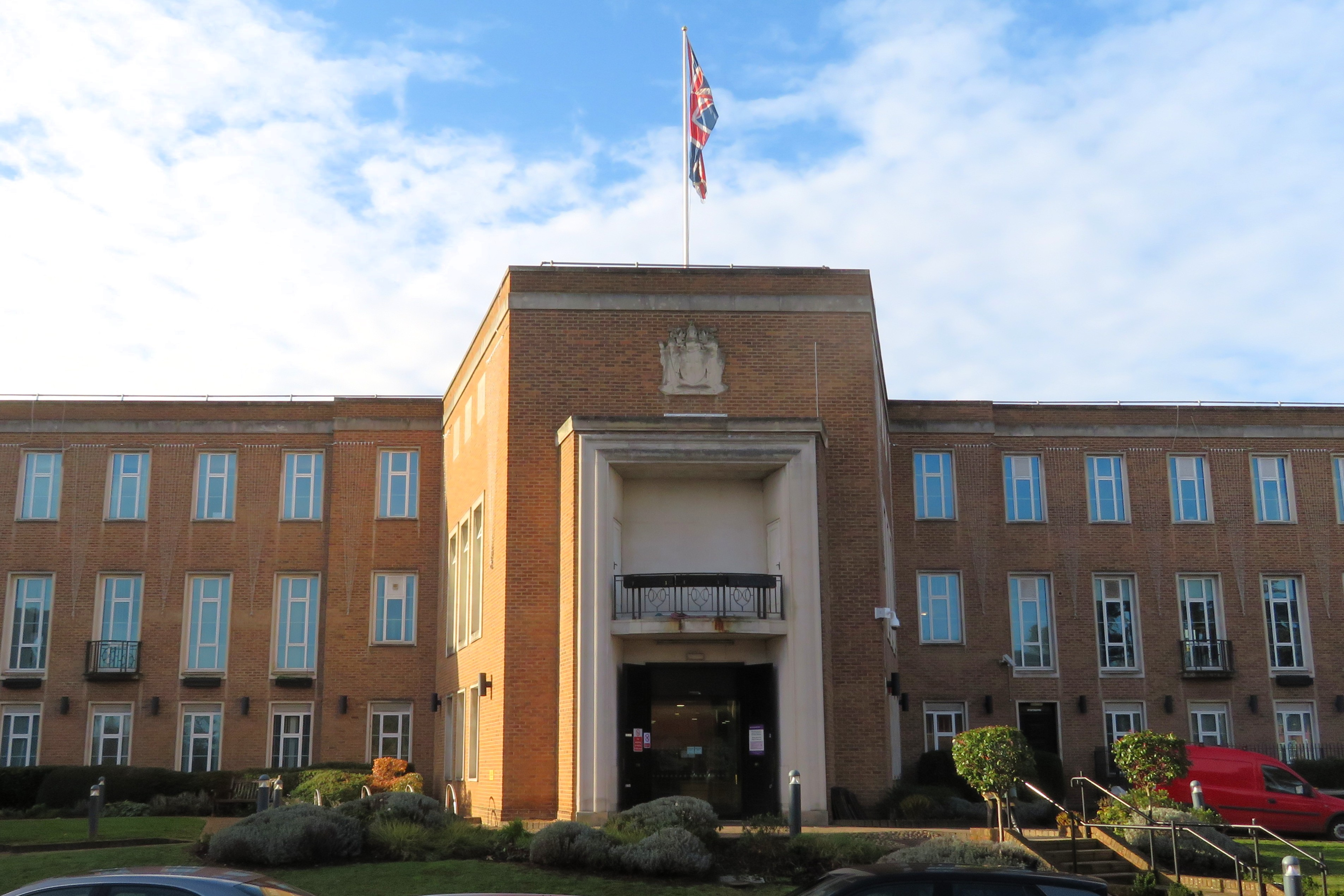
- Town Hall, St Ives Road, Maidenhead, SL6 1RF

Website
- www.rbwm.gov.uk

Windsor and Maidenhead Borough Council is the local authority for the Royal Borough of Windsor and Maidenhead, a local government district in Berkshire, England. Since 1998, the council has been a unitary authority, being a district council which also performs the functions of a county council.

The council has had a Liberal Democrat majority since 2023. It is based at Maidenhead Town Hall.

== History ==
The non-metropolitan district of Windsor and Maidenhead and its council were created in 1974 under the Local Government Act 1972. The new district covered the whole area of five former districts and part of a sixth, which were all abolished at the same time:

- Cookham Rural District
- Eton Rural District (parishes of Datchet, Horton and Wraysbury only, rest split between Beaconsfield and Slough)
- Eton Urban District
- Maidenhead Municipal Borough
- New Windsor Municipal Borough
- Windsor Rural District

The two Eton districts had been in Buckinghamshire prior to the reforms. The new district was named 'Windsor and Maidenhead' after its two largest towns.

The district was awarded borough status from its creation, allowing the chair of the council to take the title of mayor. The district was also given the additional honorific title of royal borough, which had previously been held by the municipal borough of New Windsor. The council uses the term 'Royal Borough of Windsor and Maidenhead' to refer to both the geographical district and the council as the administrative body.

The first elections to the council were held in 1973. It then acted as a shadow authority alongside the outgoing authorities until 1 April 1974 when it formally came into being and the old districts and their councils were abolished. From 1974 until 1998 the council was a lower-tier authority, with Berkshire County Council providing county-level services. The county council was abolished in 1998 and the Royal Borough of Windsor and Maidenhead took on county-level services, making it a unitary authority. Berkshire continues to legally exist as a ceremonial county and a non-metropolitan county, albeit without a county council.

== Governance ==
As a unitary authority, the council provides both district-level and county-level functions. Much of the borough is covered by civil parishes, which form an additional tier of local government for their areas, although the two largest towns of Maidenhead and Windsor are unparished.

=== Political control ===
The council has had a Liberal Democrat majority since the 2023 election, although two independent councillors also serve as members of the council's cabinet.

Political control of the council since 1974 has been as follows:

Lower-tier non-metropolitan district council

Party in control	Years
Conservative	1974–1991
No overall control	1991–1995
Liberal Democrats	1995–1997
No overall control	1997–1998

Unitary authority

Party in control	Years
No overall control	1998–1999
Liberal Democrats	1999–2000
No overall control	2000–2003
Liberal Democrats	2003–2007
Conservative	2007–2023
Liberal Democrats	2023–present

=== Leadership ===
The role of mayor is largely ceremonial in Windsor and Maidenhead, with political leadership instead being provided by the leader of the council. The leaders since 2007 have been:

Councillor	Party	From	To
Mary Rose Gliksten	Liberal Democrats	2003	May 2007
David Burbage	Conservative	22 May 2007	May 2016
Simon Dudley	Conservative	24 May 2016	12 Sep 2019
Andrew Johnson	Conservative	24 Sep 2019	May 2023
Simon Werner	Liberal Democrats	23 May 2023	

=== Composition ===
Following the 2023 election and changes of allegiance up to August 2024, the composition of the council was:

Party	Councillors
Liberal Democrats	21
Conservative	7
Borough First	6
OWRA	2
WWRA	2
Flood Prevention	1
Independent	1
Labour	1
Total	41

The Borough First, Old Windsor Residents' Association and other Independents sit together as the 'Local Independents' group; two of its members sit in the council's cabinet. The next election is due in 2027.

== Elections ==
Elections are held every four years. Since the last boundary changes in 2019 there have been 41 councillors elected from 19 wards.

The next scheduled borough council election is due to be held on Thursday 6 May 2027.

== Premises ==
The council is based at Maidenhead Town Hall, on St Ives Road in Maidenhead, which had been completed in 1962 for the former Maidenhead Borough Council.
