= 21st Oregon Legislative Assembly =

Oregon legislature, 1901

The 21st Oregon Legislative Assembly had its regular session in 1901. The meeting took place between January 14 and March 4, 1901.

== Members of the House ==
Name and City or county	District	Party
Allen, B. F. Astoria, Clatsop	19	C
Barrett, George J. Granite, Gilliam, Grant, Sherman, Wasco, Wheeler	28	R
Bernards, Hubert Forest Grove, Washington	15	U
Black, A. H. Myrtle Point, Coos	5	R
Briggs, E. D. Ashland, Douglas, Jackson	9	R
Butt, Clarence Newberg, Yamhill	13	R
Cattanach, George Canyon City, Gilliam, Grant, Sherman, Wasco, Wheeler	28	R
Colvig, George W. Grants Pass, Josephine	7	R
Dresser, A. S. Oregon City, Clackamas, Multnomah	17	R
Driscoll, John Portland, Multnomah	18	C
Eddy, B. L. Tillamook, Yamhill	14	R
Edson, O. E. Harrison, Washington	15	U
Emmitt, R. A. Keno Lake, Crook, Klamath	21	R
Geer, I. S. Burns, Harney, Malheur	27	R
Grace, W. E. Baker City, Baker	26	D
Hahn, John Astoria, Clatsop	19	C
Harris, L. T. Eugene, Lane	3	R
Hartman, Charles D. Scotts Mills, Marion	1	R
Hawkins, G. L. Independence, Polk	11	R
Hedges, Gilbert L. Oregon City, Clackamas	16	C
Heitkemper, F. A. Portland, Multnomah	18	C
Hemenway, James Cottage Grove, Lane	3	R
Holcomb, George W. Portland, Multnomah	18	C
Hume, R. D. Gold Beach, Coos, Curry	6	R
Ingram, W. H. Sodaville, Linn	2	D
Keene, Henry Stayton, Marion	1	R
Kirk, T. J. Athena, Umatilla	23	R
Kruse, J. L. Stafford, Clackamas	16	R
Lamson, E. F. Willamina, Yamhill	13	R
Matton, A. R. Lookingglass, Douglas	4	R
McAlister, D. A. La Grande, Union	25	D
McCraken, John Portland, Multnomah	18	R
McGreer, T. H. Antelope, Crook, Klamath, Lake, Wasco	21	R
McQueene, Ivan Lorane, Lane	3	R
Merrill, Norman Clatskanie, Columbia	20	R
Miller, George Arlington, Gilliam, Grant, Sherman, Wasco, Wheeler	28	R
Montague, C. F. Lebanon, Linn	2	D
Nichols, R. J. Monroe, Benton	10	R
Nottingham, C. W. Portland, Multnomah	18	C
Orton, G. M. Portland, Multnomah	18	C
Pearce, Lot L. Salem, Marion	1	R
Poorman, J. M. Woodburn, Marion	1	R
Reavis, G. S. Enterprise, Union, Wallowa	24	P
Reeder, L. B. (Speaker) Pendleton, Umatilla	23	R
Rice, Dexter Roseburg, Douglas	4	D
Roberts, A. S. The Dalles, Crook, Klamath, Lake, Wasco	21	R
Schumann, Otto Portland, Multnomah	18	C
Shipley, J. J. Portland, Multnomah	18	C
Simpson, I. M. Lewisville, Lincoln, Polk	12	D
Smith, H. A. Portland, Multnomah	18	C
Smith, J. N. Salem, Marion	1	R
Stewart, Matthew Talent, Jackson	8	R
Story, George L. Portland, Multnomah	18	R
Talbert, J. A. Clackamas, Clackamas	16	R
Thompson, M. E. Portland, Multnomah	18	C
Thomson, A. B. Echo, Morrow, Umatilla	22	R
Vincent, A. W. Tualatin, Washington	15	U
Watson, D. M. Portland, Multnomah	18	C
Whitney, J. J. Albany, Linn	2	D
