= Henry Keene =

Henry Keene may refer to:

- Henry George Keene (orientalist) (1781–1864), soldier, civil servant, and orientalist
- Henry George Keene (historian) (1826–1915), his son, English historian of medieval and modern India
- Henry Keene (politician) (1830–?), legislator in the U.S. state of Oregon
- Henry Keene (architect) (1726–1776), English architect
