= Hartwell House, Buckinghamshire =

Country house in Buckinghamshire, England

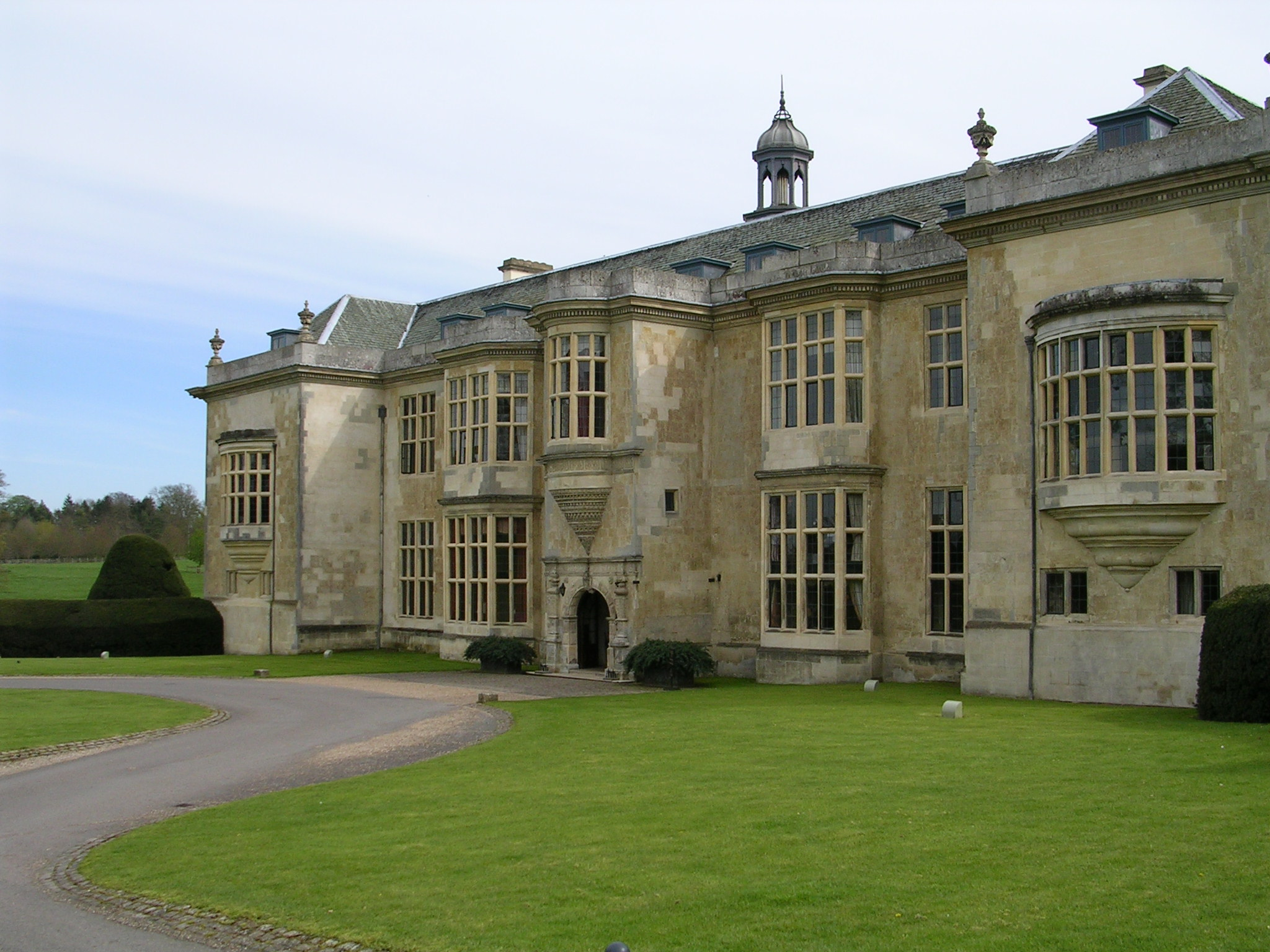
- Hartwell House, north front
- Interactive map of the Hartwell House, Buckinghamshire area

General information
- Architectural style: Jacobean, Georgian
- Location: Hartwell, Vale of Aylesbury, Buckinghamshire HP17 8NR
- Coordinates: 51.8051°N 0.8468°W
- Current tenants: National Trust
- Year built: early 17th century
- Renovated: 1759-1761 (Henry Keene); 1980s (Eric Throssell)
- Owner: Ernest Cook Trust

Technical details
- Material: ashlar stone

Design and construction
- Designations: Grade II* listed building 1000192

Other information
- Public transit: Aylesbury railway station

Website
- hartwell-house.com

Hartwell House is a country house in the parish of Hartwell in Buckinghamshire, Southern England. The house is owned by the Ernest Cook Trust, has been a Historic House Hotel since 1989, and in 2008 was leased to the National Trust. The Grade I listed house is Jacobean with a Georgian front and Rococo interiors, set in a picturesque landscaped park, and is most famous as the home of exiled French king Louis XVIII in the early 19th century.

== Location ==
The house is in the village of Stone along the A418, about 3 miles (4.8 km) from the centre of Aylesbury, the nearest large town, which is about 40 miles (64 km) from the centre of London via the A41.

== History ==
The property was first mentioned in the Domesday Book of 1086 and belonged to William Peverel.

The core of the present house was constructed in the early 17th century for the Hampden family and then the Lee family. The Lees, an old Buckinghamshire family, acquired Hartwell c.1650 by marriage into the Hampdens.

=== Bourbon Court ===
The French King in exile

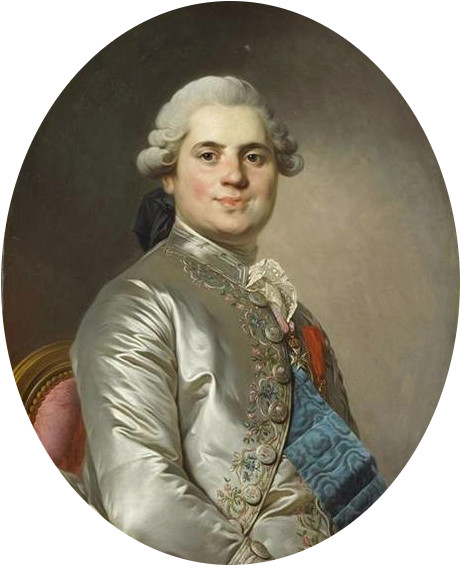
Louis Stanislas Xavier

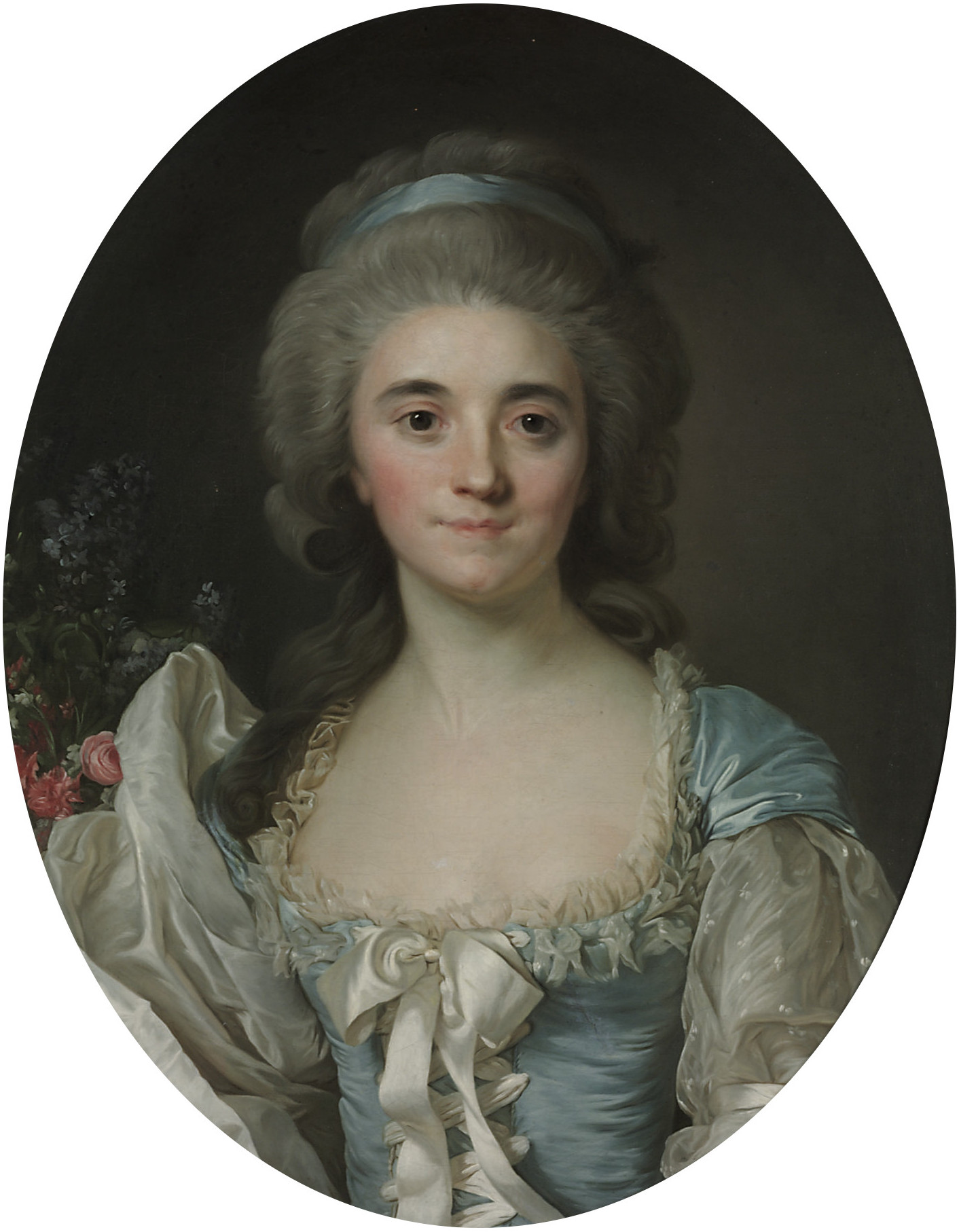
Marie Joséphine of Savoy

Exiled Bourbon royalty lived at Hartwell following the French Revolution

Between 1809 and 1814 the owner of the house, Sir Charles Lee, let the mansion to the French prince Louis Stanislas Xavier, Count of Provence, the future King Louis XVIII. The arrival of the impoverished prince and his court at Hartwell was not a happy experience for the mansion, with once grand and imperious courtiers farming chickens and assorted small livestock on the lead roofs. Louis's wife, Marie Joséphine of Savoy died at Hartwell in 1810. After her death, her body was carried first to Westminster Abbey, and one year later to Sardinia, where the Savoy King of Sardinia had withdrawn during Napoleonic occupation of Turin and Piedmont; she is buried in Cagliari Cathedral. Prince Louis signed the document accepting the French crown in the library of the house, following the defeat of Napoleon.

=== Scientific hub ===
In 1827, Dr John Lee, an astronomer, inherited the house from the unmarried Revd Sir George Lee. During his ownership, the British Meteorological Society, now the Royal Meteorological Society, was founded in the library in 1850.

==== The Hartwell Observatory ====
William Henry Smyth, one of Lee's regular scientist guests invited to discuss theories "year after year" at Hartwell, who had helped with the design of the telescope and cupola that Lee had installed, described the house and the Hartwell Observatory established there, in Ædes Hartwellianæ: Or, Notices of the Manor and Mansion of Hartwell (Printed for private circulation, by J.B. Nichols and Son, London, 1851). Many of the illustrations in the book are by Smyth's wife Annarella and by his son-in-law, Rev. Prof. Baden Powell.

=== Subsequent use ===
Revd Nicholas Lee inherited the house when his brother, Dr John, died on 25 February 1866 at Hartwell. The house remained a private residence until 1938, when, at risk of demolition, the estate was acquired by the philanthropist Ernest Cook and the contents sold off by public auction. The estate passed to the Ernest Cook Trust when it was founded in 1952.

In the 1960s the house became a girls' finishing school, then was let in the 1980s to be run as a hotel. The house was converted and became part of the Historic House Hotels group. Its proximity to Chequers means that it has frequently been the host of international and government summits and meetings. A speciality of the house restaurant is the local Aylesbury Duck.

== Architectural description ==
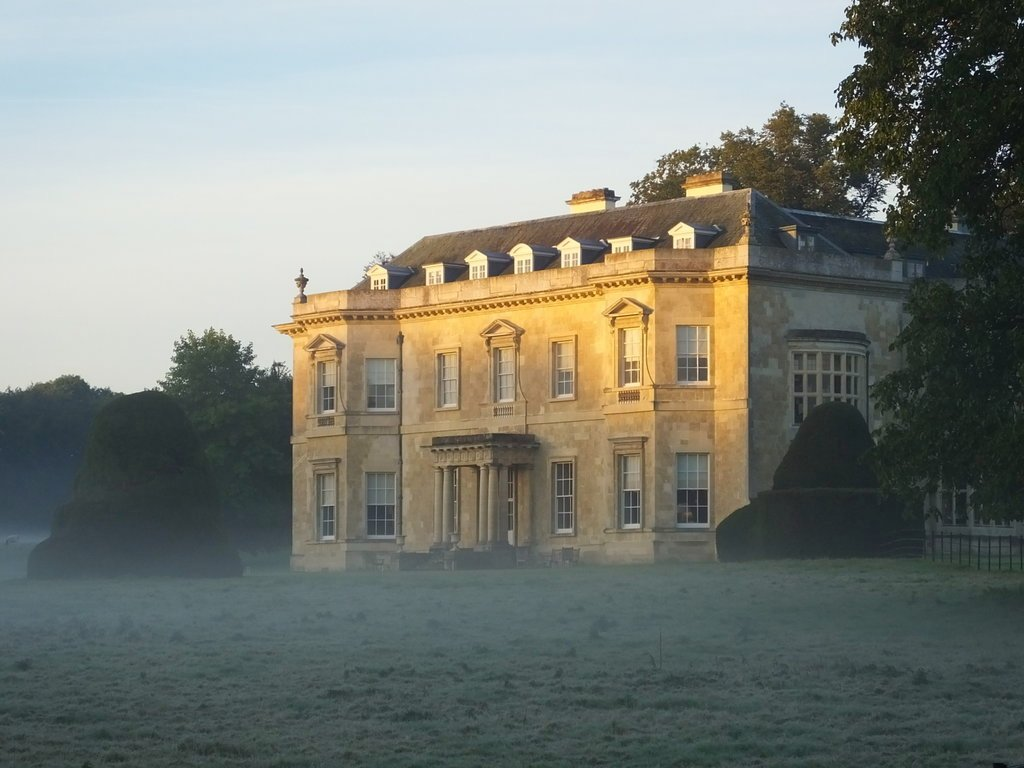
The southern aspect of Hartwell House

The Jacobean north front of the house is constructed of ashlar and has a projecting porch with a bow window above. At each end of this facade are two flanking canted bays, each with a double height oriel window. Immediately on each side of the porch are two large windows of the hall inside. Hiding the roofscape is a parapet with vases erected in 1740.

Between 1759 and 1761, architect Henry Keene substantially enlarged and "Georgianised" the house, and built the east front with its canted bay windows and a central porch in the Tuscan style. Inside, the great hall has stucco panels, and three reception rooms with rococo chimneypieces.

The 1980s conversion to a hotel was overseen by the architect Eric Throssell who created a new dining room in the style of Sir John Soane, by enclosing the former 18th-century open arcaded porch. The former semi-circular galleried entrance vestibule became an inner hall. Throssel was also responsible for the design and recreation of the cupola crowning the roof.

== Gardens ==
The 90 acres (36 ha) of gardens at Hartwell were laid out by Capability Brown c.1750. The North Avenue is a grand vista through trees planted in 1830, today terminating at the edge of Aylesbury. The gardens are reminiscent of nearby Stowe, with statues, an obelisk and ornamental bridge.

The Hartwell Estate currently covers 1,800 acres (7.3 km^{2}) of farmland surrounding Hartwell House.

Hartwell's Egyptian Spring is a folly built in 1850 by Joseph Bonomi the Younger, an Egyptologist. It is an alcove seat on the western side of Lower Hartwell opposite a small spring. The stone pylon bears the Greek inscription "ΑΡΙΣΤοΝ ΜΕΝ ΥΔΩΡ", translated as "Water is Best", attributed to Thales.

Within the grounds stands a ruined church, St Mary's Church, Hartwell, which was built between 1753 and 1755 to a design by Henry Keene for Sir William Lee.

The grounds of Hartwell House

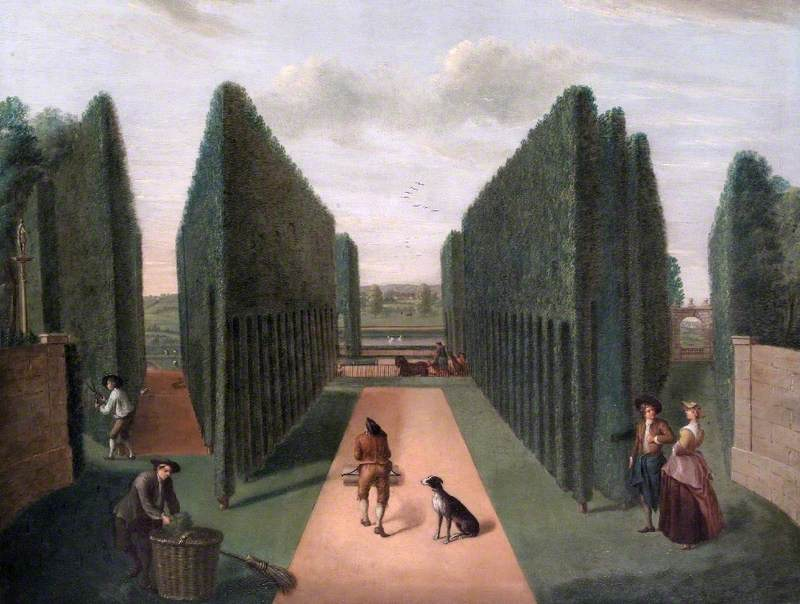
1738 painting of the gardens by Balthazar Nebot

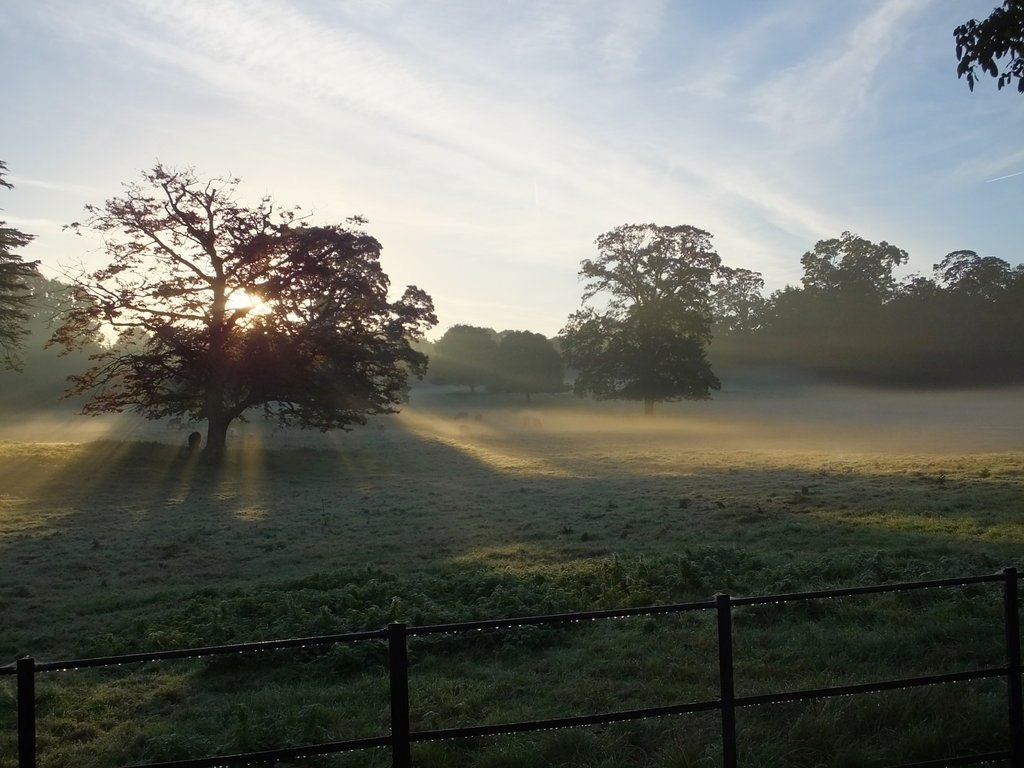
Dawn over the Hartwell Estate

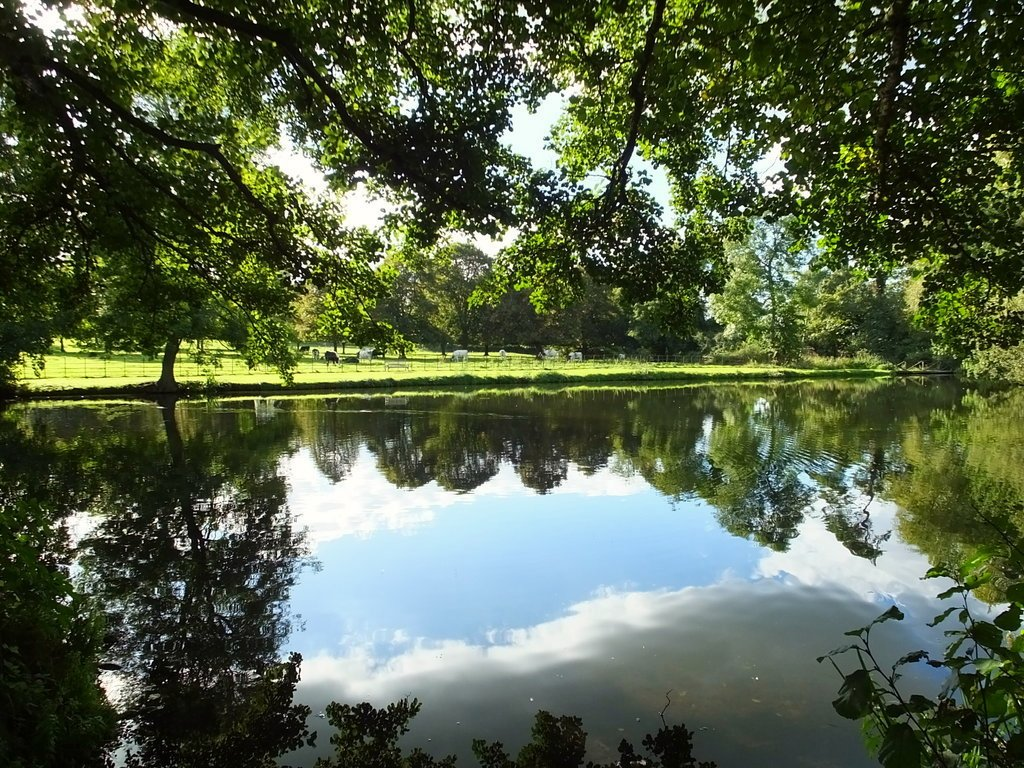
The lake

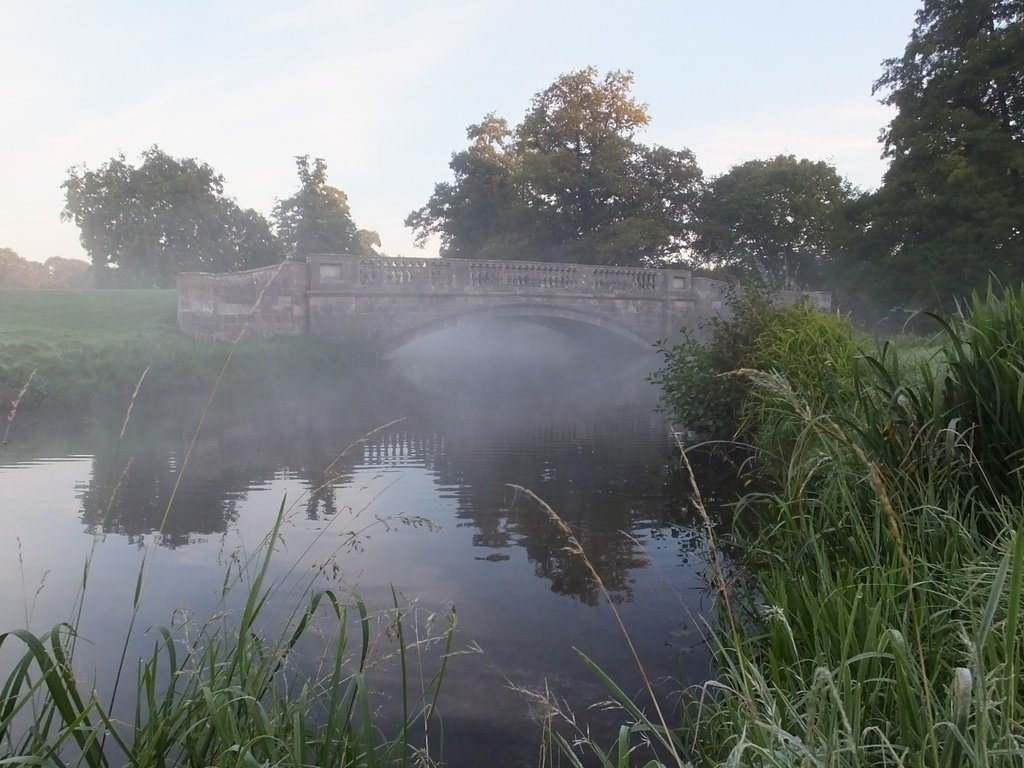
Bridge over the lake

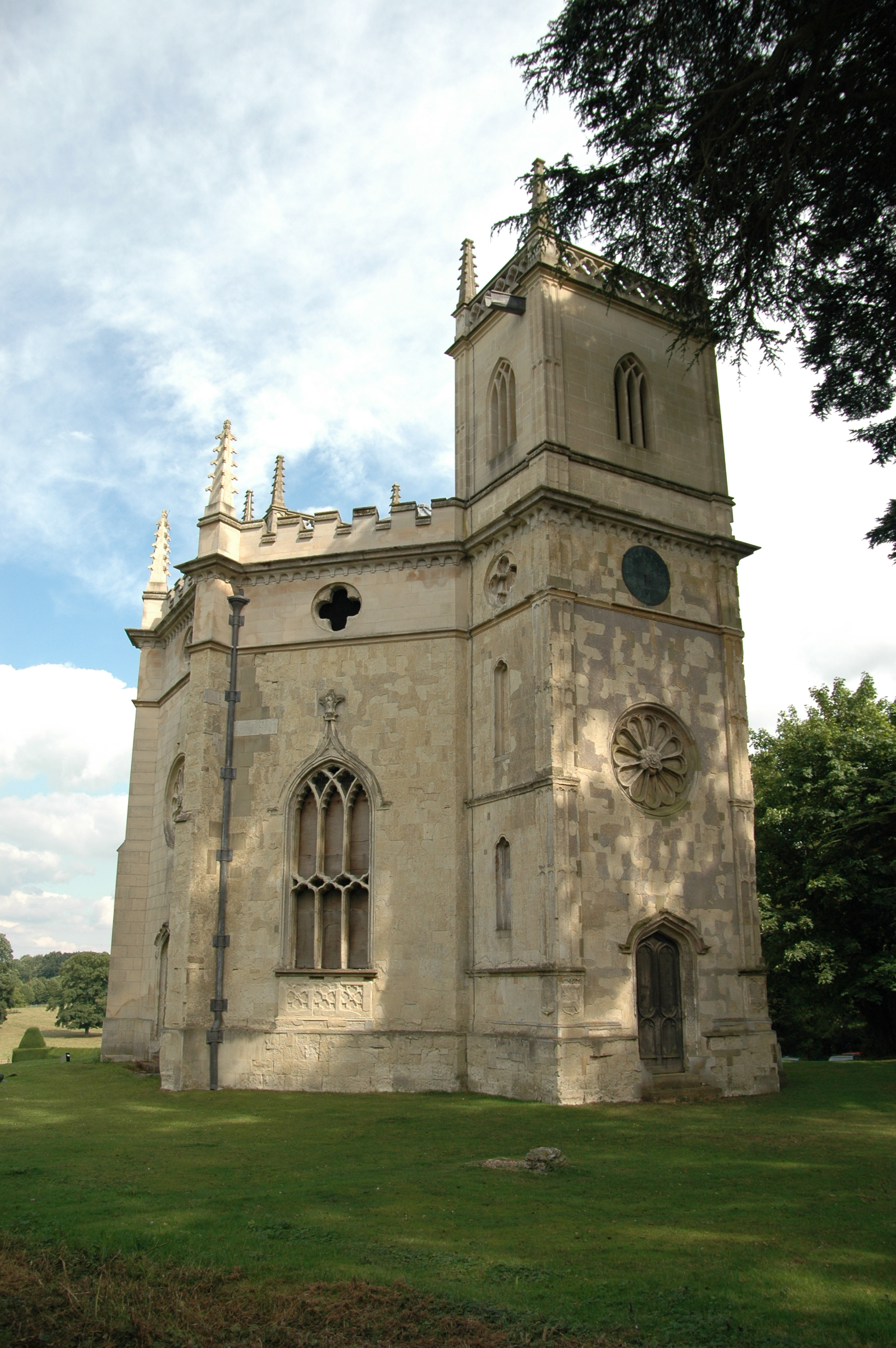
Church of St Mary the Virgin

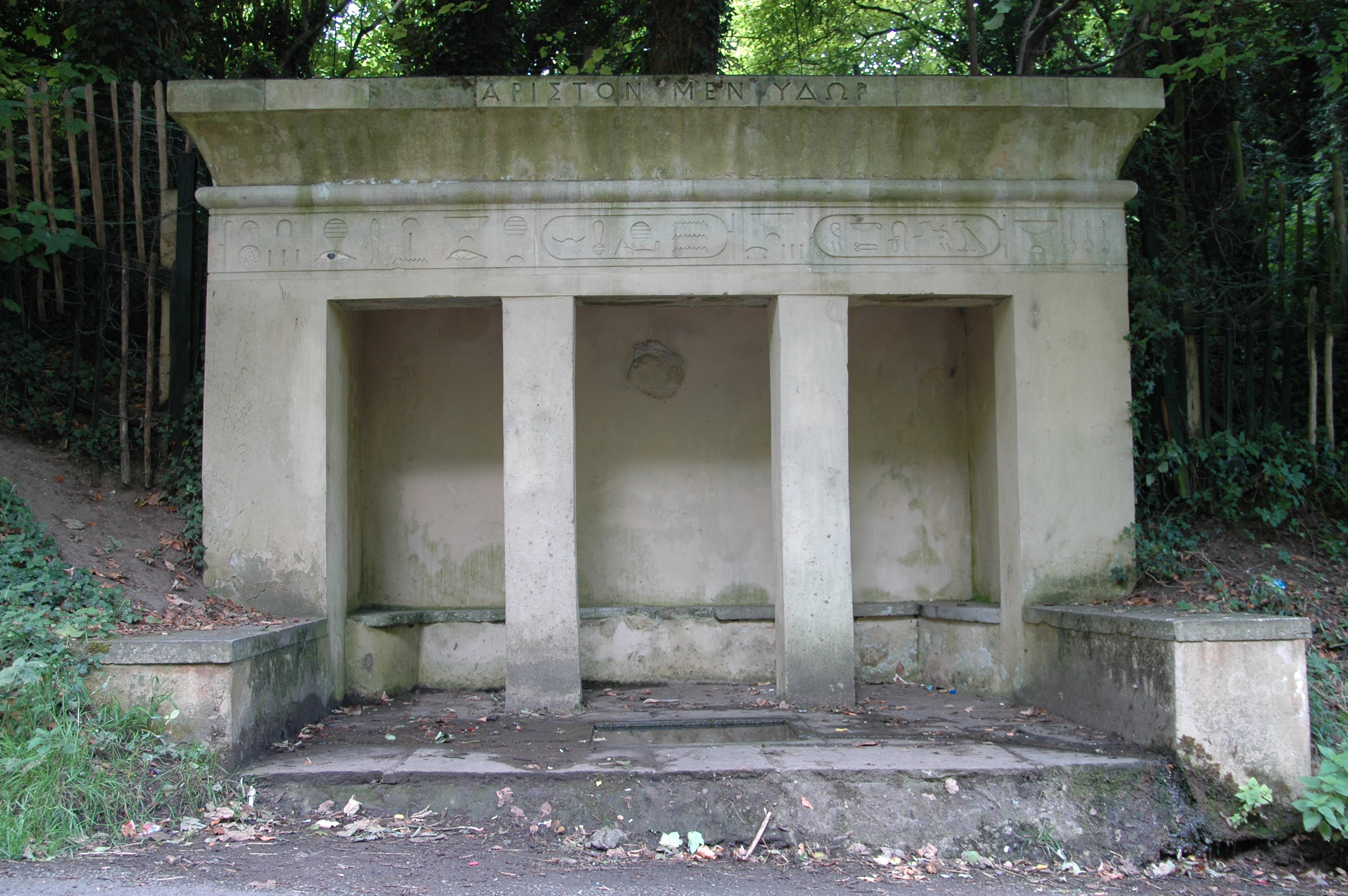
The Egyptian Spring

== Acquisition by the National Trust ==
In September 2008 the National Trust acquired a long lease of the house from the Ernest Cook Trust (until 2111). The gift had been under discussion for almost 30 years and in 1997 the National Trust accepted restrictive covenants over all three properties. The house and grounds were gifted the Trust by the directors of Historic House Hotels (HHH). The house continues its present use as a hotel under the existing HHH management. Three National Trust directors joined the HHH board and all profits will go to Trust funds to provide for the long-term care of the three houses.

== Public access ==
Following the acquisition by the National Trust in 2008, it was suggested that arrangements would be made for the gardens and grounds of the hall to be open to visitors, along with tours of the ground floor rooms. Today, Hartwell House only permits access to the house and gardens to paying guests of the hotel or restaurant.
