= Sedrup =

Hamlet in Buckinghamshire, England

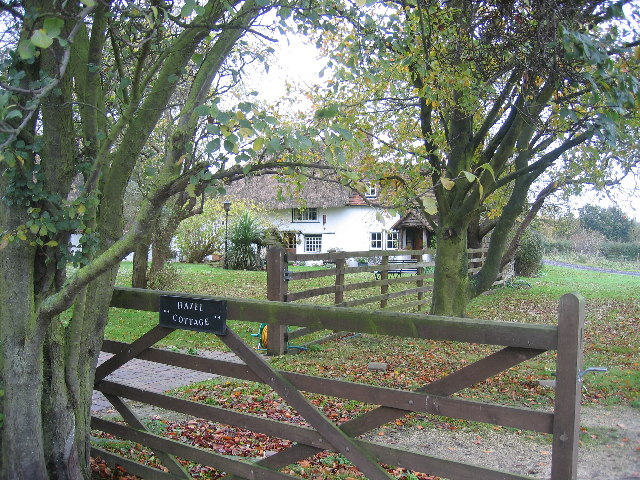
- Hazel Cottage at Sedrup

- Location within Buckinghamshire
- OS grid reference: SP8011
- Civil parish: Stone with Bishopstone and Hartwell
- Unitary authority: Buckinghamshire
- Ceremonial county: Buckinghamshire
- Region: South East
- Country: England
- Sovereign state: United Kingdom
- Post town: AYLESBURY
- Postcode district: HP17
- Dialling code: 01296
- Police: Thames Valley
- Fire: Buckinghamshire
- Ambulance: South Central
- UK Parliament: Mid Buckinghamshire

Sedrup (formerly Southwarp or Southcote) is a hamlet in Buckinghamshire, England. It is located south west of the town of Aylesbury, close to the villages of Stone, Bishopstone and Hartwell which also provide the name of the civil parish within which Sedrup lies.

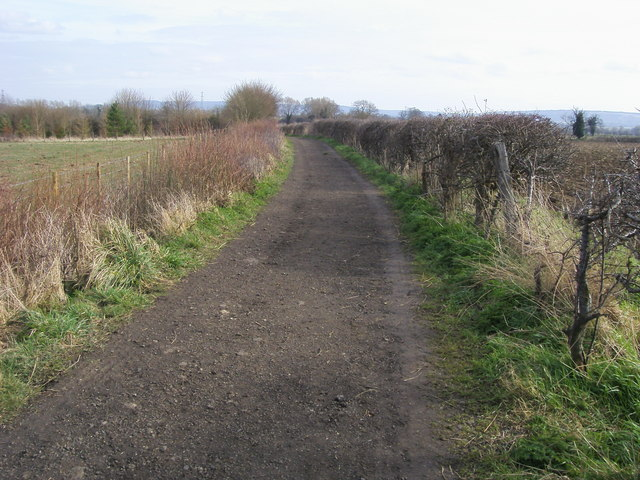
North Bucks Way going through Sedrup.

Most of the hamlet is within the boundaries of the Sedrup Conservation Area.

Sedrup contains 5 grade II listed structures. 4 of which are cottage and one a house.

== World War 2 ==
During World War II, Prisoner of War Camp No. 36 Hartwell Dog Track was located in Sedrup. It housed Italian prisoners from 1942 to 1946 and consisted mostly of tents with one hut. A 1946 RAF aerial photo of the site shows camp buildings at Grid reference SP797121 51.8018°N 0.8454°W, on what is now the Meadoway housing estate adjacent to Sedrup Lane. Remains of the camp were still evident on the site in the 1950s.

== Gallery ==
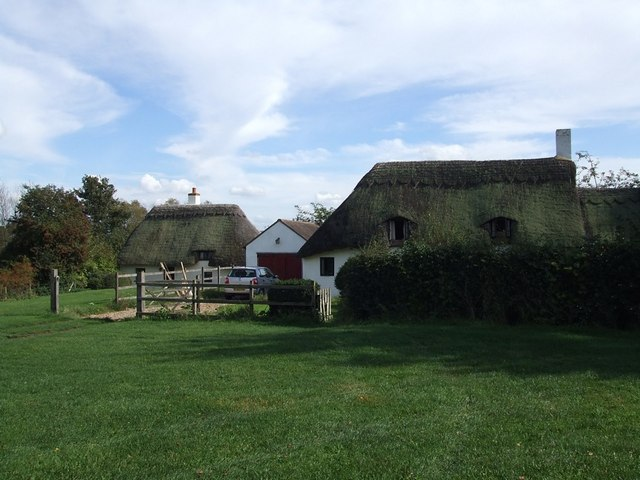
These thatched cottages are at the end of the no-through-road lane which leads to Sedrup.

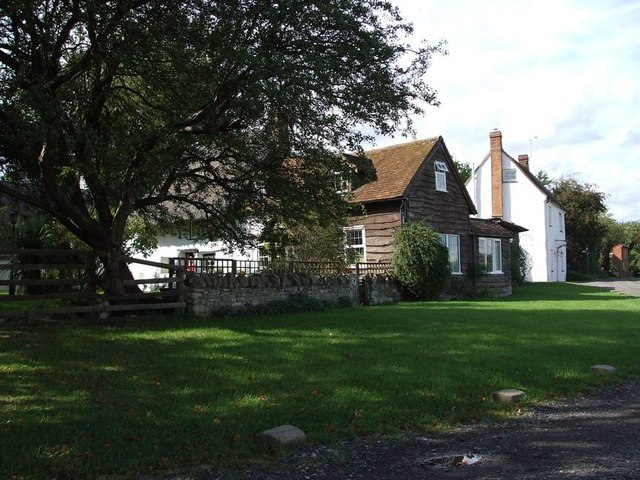
More of the cottages.

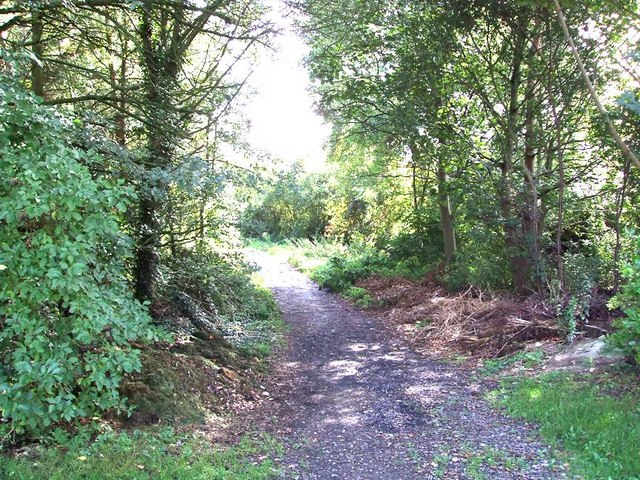
The lane from Hartwell to Sedrup continues as a bridleway and long-distance path – the Midshires Way and the North Buckinghamshire Way.

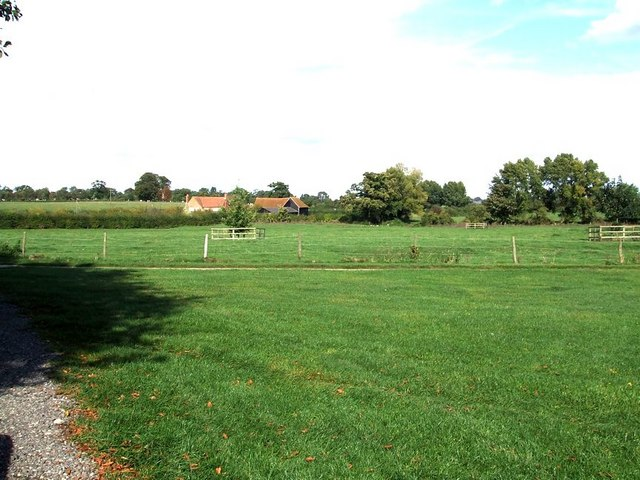
Sedrup Farmhouse
