= Racton =

Hamlet in West Sussex, England

Coordinates: 50.877105°N 0.893100°W

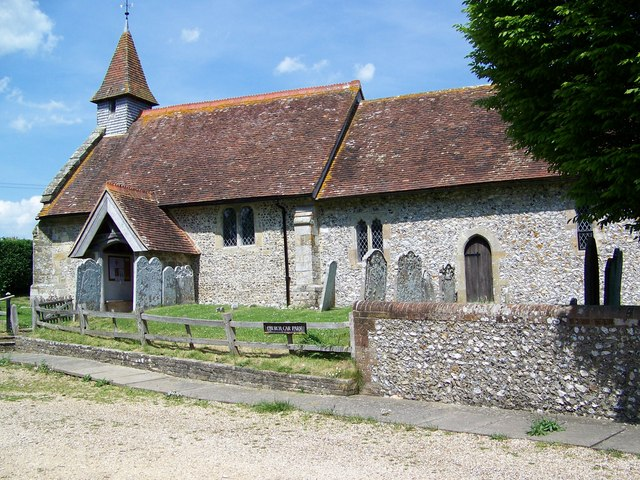
- St Peter's Church

- Location within West Sussex
- Civil parish: Stoughton
- District: Chichester
- Shire county: West Sussex
- Region: South East
- Country: England
- Sovereign state: United Kingdom
- Post town: Chichester
- Postcode district: PO18
- Dialling code: 01243
- Police: Sussex
- Fire: West Sussex
- Ambulance: South East Coast
- UK Parliament: Chichester

Racton is a hamlet in the civil parish of Stoughton, in the Chichester district of West Sussex, England. It lies on the B2147 road 2.1 miles (3.4 km) northeast of Emsworth. The hamlet lies along the River Ems. 0.4 miles north of the hamlet is the Racton Monument, constructed between 1766 and 1775 by the 2nd Earl of Halifax. Another prominent structure just outside the hamlet is Lordington Manor, former home of the Pole family. St Peter's Church, located in the centre of the hamlet, is a Grade I listed building, dating from the 12th-13th century. Racton was a civil parish until it was abolished and merged with Stoughton on 1 April 1933. In 1931 the parish of Racton had a population of 113.

== Gallery ==
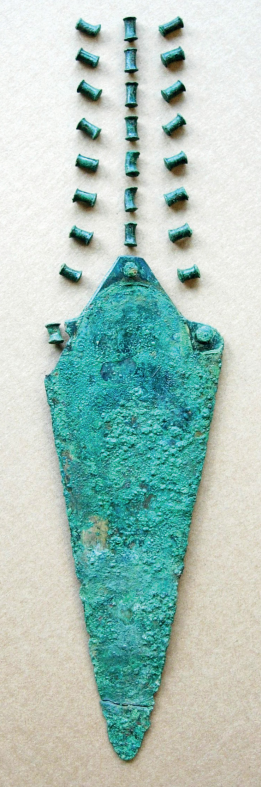
Early Bronze Age dagger from Racton, c. 2200 BC

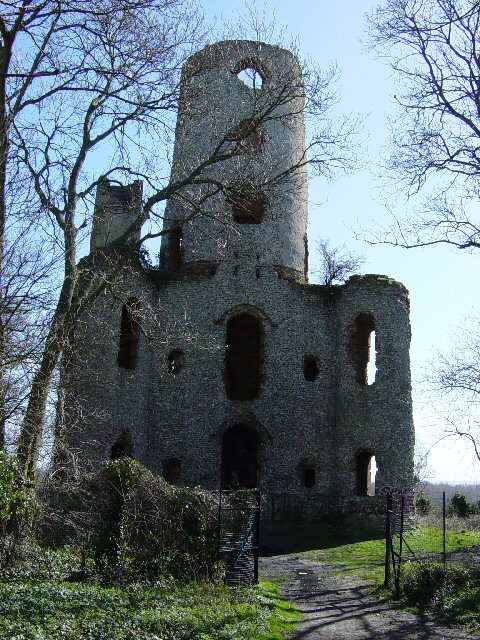
Racton Monument lies north of the hamlet

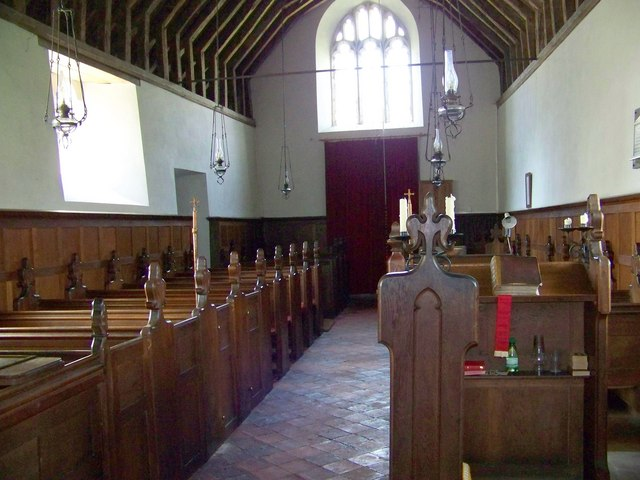
Nave inside St Peter's Church

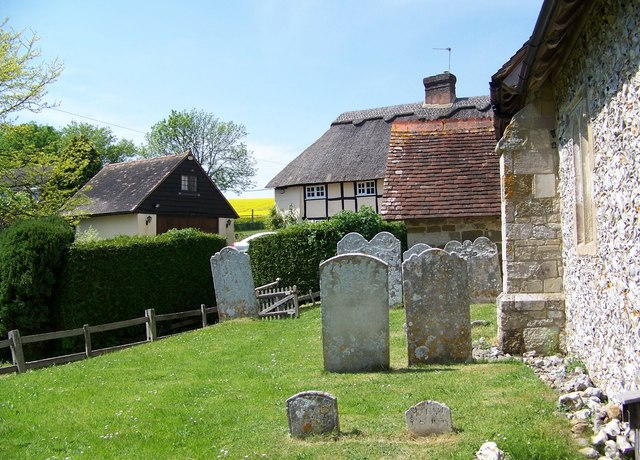
Cottage and St Peter's Church

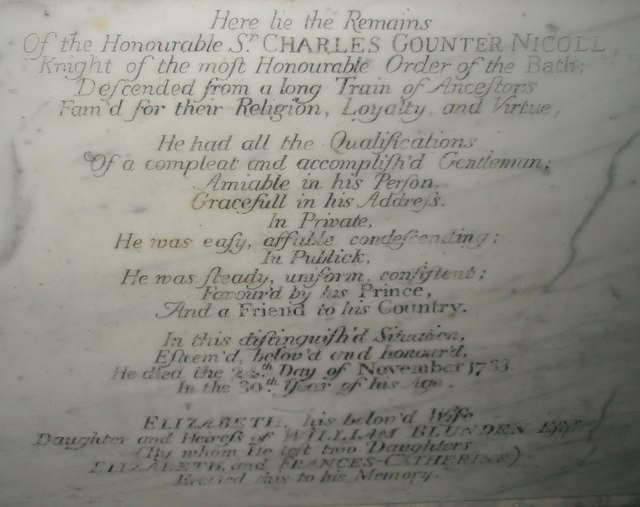
Resting place of Sir Charles Gounter Nicoll inside St Peter's Church
