= James Hemenway =

James Hemenway may refer to:

- James A. Hemenway, American politician from Indiana
- James Hemenway (Oregon politician)
