= St Mary's Church, Hartwell =

Coordinates: 51.8052°N 0.8486°W

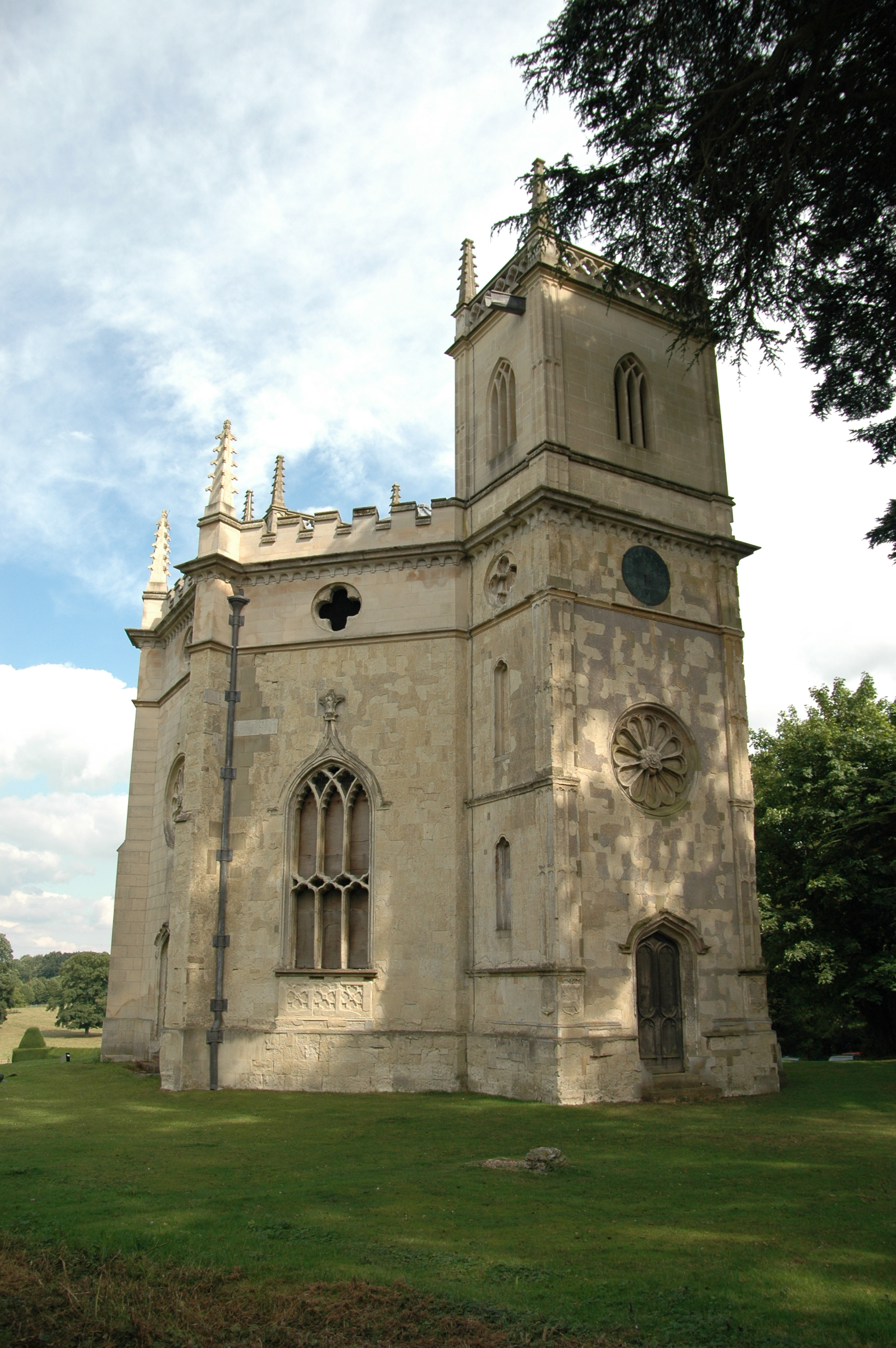
- St Mary's Church, Hartwell, from the southeast

- Location in Buckinghamshire
- OS grid reference: SP 795 125
- Location: Hartwell, Buckinghamshire
- Country: England
- Denomination: Anglican
- Website: Churches Conservation Trust

Architecture
- Functional status: Redundant
- Heritage designation: Grade II*
- Designated: 21 December 1967
- Architect: Henry Keene
- Architectural type: Church
- Style: Early Gothic Revival
- Groundbreaking: 1753
- Completed: 1755

Specifications
- Materials: Stone ashlar

St Mary's Church is a redundant Anglican church in the village of Hartwell, Buckinghamshire, England. It is under the care of the Churches Conservation Trust.

The church is now ruined, and stands in the grounds of Hartwell House, to the north of the A418 road.

== History ==
The church was built between 1753 and 1755 to a design by Henry Keene for Sir William Lee. It is an early example of Gothic Revival architecture and was planned to be a feature in the grounds of Hartwell House. The church is now a ruin. On 21 December 1967 it was designated as a Grade II* listed building. Grade II* listing means that it is considered to be a particularly important building of more than special interest. The church was declared redundant on 23 March 1973, and was vested in the Churches Conservation Trust on 27 July 1975. When the Trust took over the church it was in poor condition and without a roof. In 2000 repairs were carried out, which included rebuilding the roof in its original design using Westmorland slate, repairing the roof of the east tower, and repairing some of the stonework on the exterior of the church. The interior of the church is not accessible to visitors.

== Architecture ==
Built in ashlar stone, the building has an octagonal plan with two towers, one at the east end, the other at the west. Its main windows have three lights and contain Y-tracery. Around the summit of the church is a battlemented parapet with crocketted pinnacles and a moulded cornice. Below this is a string course. Between the string course and the parapet are quatrefoil windows. On the north and south sides, and on the outer sides of the towers are rose windows. At the summit of the towers are openwork parapets and more crocketted pinnacles.

== See also ==
- List of churches preserved by the Churches Conservation Trust in South East England
