= River Ems (Chichester Harbour) =

River in Sussex and Hampshire, England

Coordinates: 50.90363°N 0.85227°W

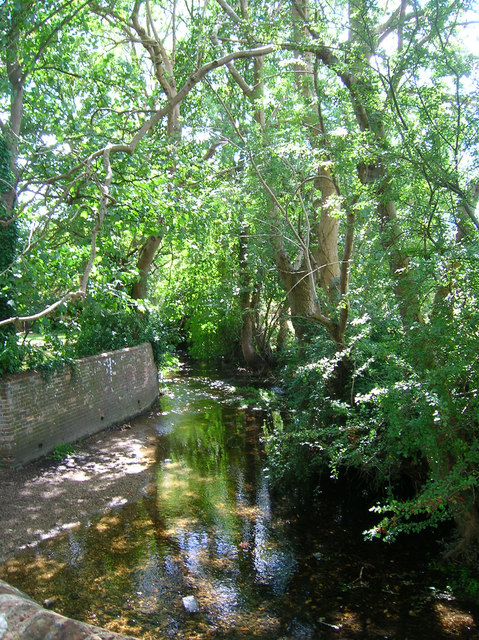
River Ems, Westbourne

The River Ems is a much-sluiced, six miles (9.7 km) chalk stream that is located in the far west of the county of West Sussex, England. It flows from Stoughton in the north, then southwest through Westbourne to Emsworth in the South. The last one and a half miles (2.4 km), of this river, delimits eastern Hampshire, before flowing into the sea at Chichester Harbour.

The river was so named, the "Ems", by a chronicler in the Tudor period.

== Sources ==
Over the centuries various cartographers and chroniclers have suggested a variety of sources for the Ems. According to research by David J. Rudkin (Note: David J Rudkin was an archaeologist and the former curator of Fishbourne Palace.)the River Ems has its source about one and a half miles (2 km) east of Stoughton.

== From source to the sea ==
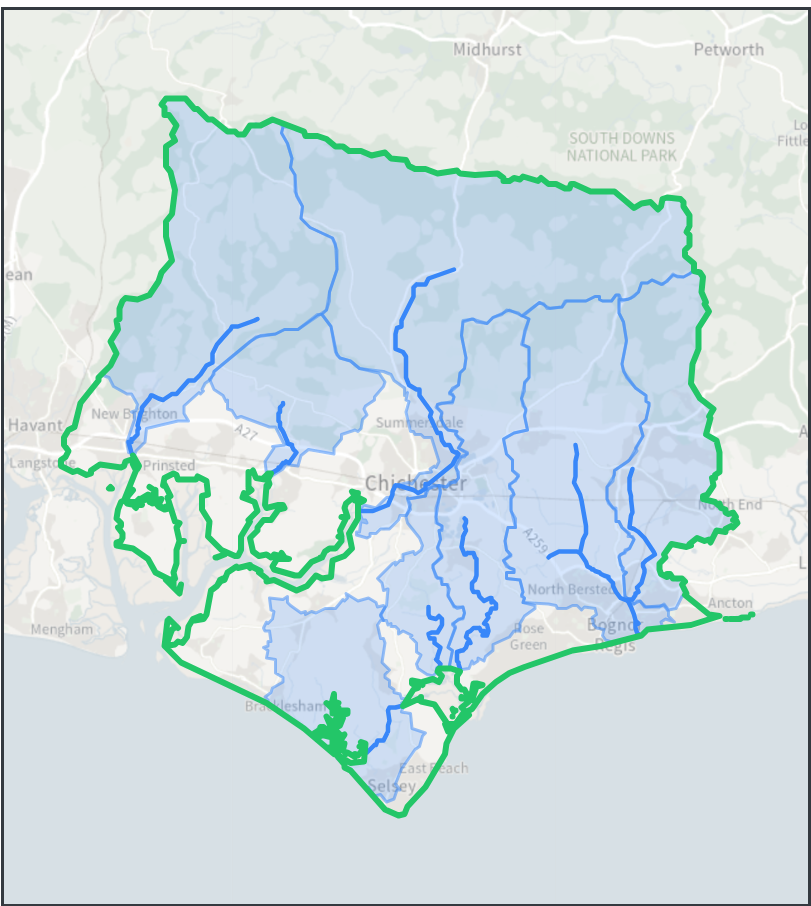
Western Streams Operational Catchment.

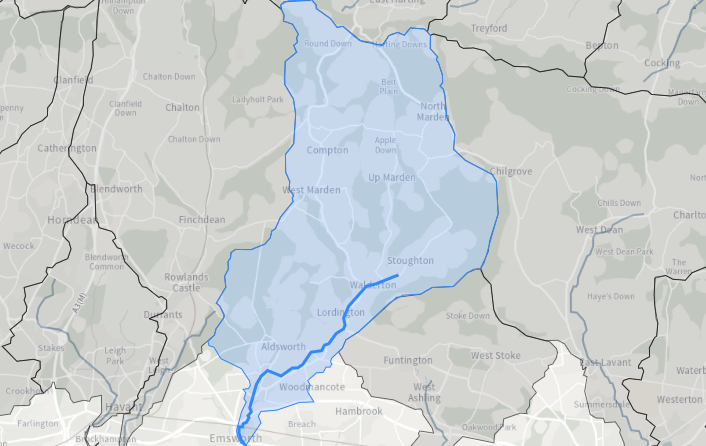
Catchment area of the River Ems and its route to the sea.

The River Ems, is a chalk stream that has a catchment area of over 60 square kilometres (6,000 ha), and its upper reaches drain the South Downs. It is one of eight water bodies that are designated by the Environment Agency, as being part of the Western Streams Operational Catchment.

Although, the lower and some of the middle reaches of the river, equating to (approximately) the last 3 kilometres (1.9 mi), flow throughout the year, the rest of the middle as well as the upper reaches of the river naturally stop flowing during dry spells.

Increasingly, sections of the river stop flowing during dry spells; this is largely due to the level of abstraction in recent years. The river has several minor tributaries in the upper and middle reach. There are some significant tributaries at the lower reach of the river.

From its source the River Ems runs past:

- the hamlet that includes well-preserved Lordington House
- Racton Monument which has nearby in Racton hamlet the church for Lordington
- A copse, Ractonpark Dell
- the village of Westbourne, has the westmost section of the Ems, in Sussex. The lower Ems here receives flows from its most significant tributary, named the 'Aldsworth Arm'.
- From Westbourne the Ems naturally flows all year. It descends under the railway at Emsworth (in Hampshire), becoming tidal, drains Brook Meadow to Peter and Slipper Mill Ponds from where it discharges into the sea. At lower tides it helps forms at the head of Emsworth Channel in the harbour; its last few metres enable access to Emworth Marina, the other former tidal mill pond.

== Etymology ==
It is sometimes thought that the town of Emsworth derives its name from that of the River Ems, this is not correct as before the 16th Century the stream was originally called the Bourne. (Note: Some sources suggest that it was originally called the "Bourne" or "West Bourne" but also has been referred to as "The Brook".) The river was renamed by the 16th century chronicler Raphael Holinshed. Many of the towns and villages that the River Ems runs through or past still have Bourne as a suffix. e.g.:Westbourne.

The Emille cometh first between Racton and Stansted, then down to Emilswort or Emmesworth, and so into the Ocean. Separating Sussex from Hampshire almost from the very head.

— Holinshed 1577, p. 21

== Citations ==
- arrt (2022). "River Ems Stakeholder Survey Report" (PDF). Havant: Portsmouth Water Company. Archived from the original (PDF) on 12 February 2026.
- Cole, S.J.; Howard, P.J.; Moore, R.J. (2009), Hydrological Modelling for the Rivers Lavant and Ems, Centre for Ecology and Hydrology, pp. 1–109
- Environment Agency (2021). "Ems Water Body". Department of Environment and Rural Affairs.
- Hamilton, James (2021). "David J Rudkin obituary". London: The Guardian. Archived from the original on 12 February 2026.
- Holinshed, Raphael (1577). The firste volume of the chronicles of England, Scotlande, and Irelande etc. Vol. 1. London: Imprinted for Iohn Hunne. OCLC 10105970.
- Lower, Mark Anthony (1864). Mark Antony Lower (ed.). "The Ems" (PDF). Sussex Archaeological Collections Relating to the History and Antiquities of the County. The Rivers of Sussex II. XVI. Lewes: SAC: 263–268.
- Mulder, Peter (2022). "River Ems Flow Investigation" (PDF). Havant: Portsmouth Water. Archived from the original (PDF) on 13 February 2026.
- Ordnance Survey (1912). Sussex LX.6 (includes: Havant; Westbourne)Revised: 1910, Published: 1912 (Map). Ordnance Survey England & Wales County Series : Parish edition 1:2500.
- Reger, A J C (1967). A Short History of Emsworth and Warblington. Portsmouth: Pott and Horsey. p. 17.
- Rudkin, David J (1984). The River Ems and related Watercourses. Westbourne. OCLC 499701376.
