= Maidenhead Town Hall =

Municipal building in Maidenhead, Berkshire, England

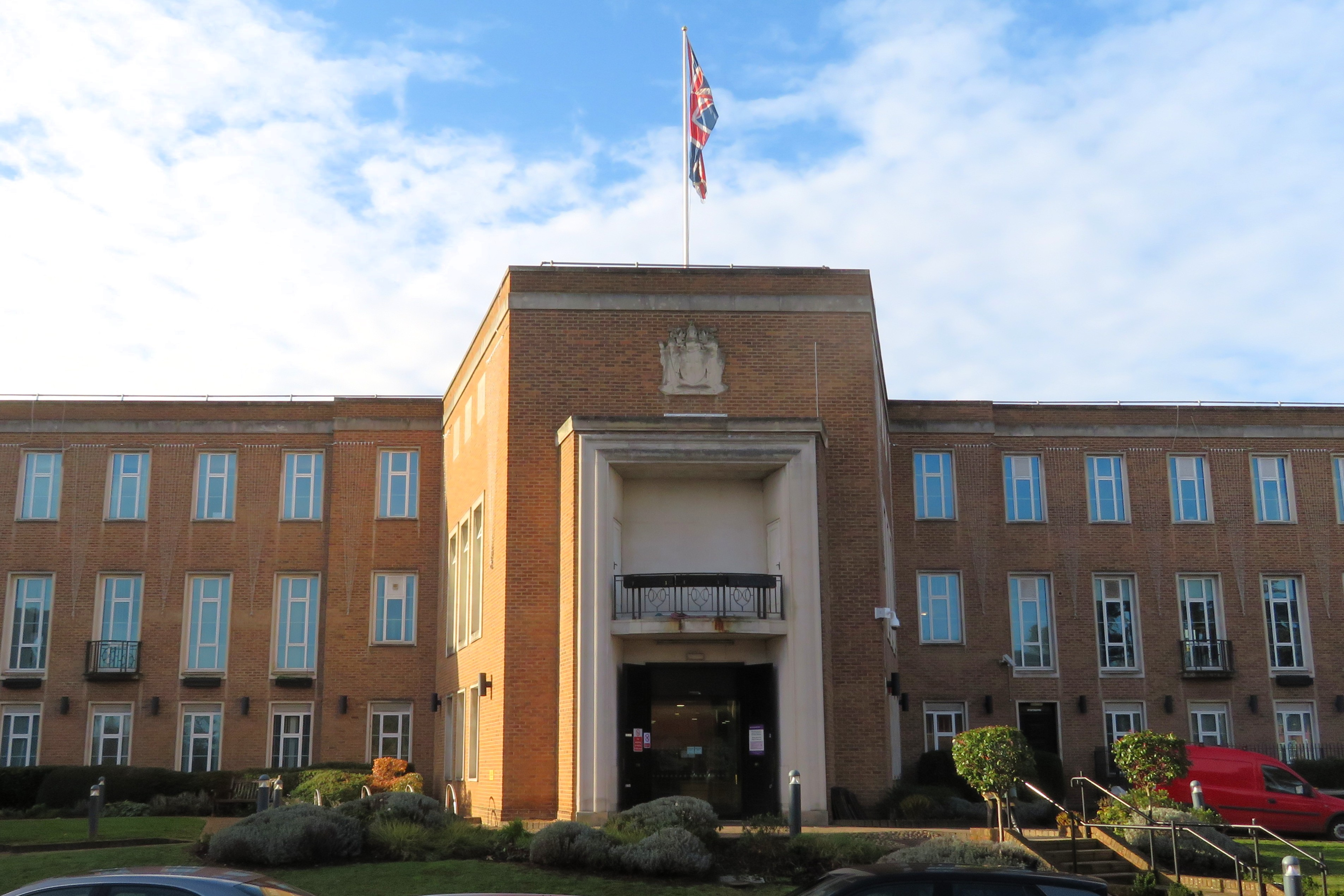
- Maidenhead Town Hall

- Shown in Berkshire
- 51.5219°N 0.7187°W
- Location: St Ives Road, Maidenhead

History
- Built: 1962

Site notes
- Architect(s): North & Partners and Sir Hubert Worthington
- Architectural style: Neo-Georgian style

Maidenhead Town Hall is a municipal building in St Ives Road, Maidenhead, Berkshire, England.

== History ==
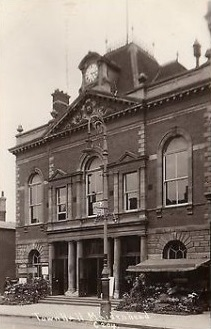
The 18th-century guildhall, demolished in 1963

A medieval guildhall was constructed in the High Street around 1430 and replaced by a larger guildhall, designed by Theodosius Keene in the Italianate style, in 1777. In the late 1950s, Maidenhead Borough Council decided to demolish the aging 18th-century guildhall and replace it with a modern facility.

The site selected for the new building had previously been occupied by a 16th-century mansion known as St Ives Place. King Henry VIII granted St Ives Place to Anne of Cleves for life as part of his divorce settlement with her in 1541. In the 18th century, it had become the home of Peniston Powney, the MP for Berkshire and by the early 1920s it was owned by another politician, Lord Desborough.

The new building, which was designed by North & Partners and Sir Hubert Worthington in the Neo-Georgian style, was officially opened by the Queen, accompanied by the Duke of Edinburgh, in June 1962. The Desborough Suite, which was created to offer conferencing and theatre facilities, was named in honour of the former owner of St Ives Place.

It was the meeting place of Maidenhead Borough Council until 1974 when it became the headquarters of the enlarged Windsor and Maidenhead Borough Council. The town hall was extensively refurbished, to a design by McBains Cooper, at a cost of £1.6 million, in 2014, and proposals for the refurbishment of the Desborough Suite, at a cost of £2 million, were approved in 2019.

== In popular culture ==
The building was used as a location for several of the Carry On series of films starting with Carry On Doctor in 1967.
