= St John's Hospital, Stone =

St John's Hospital
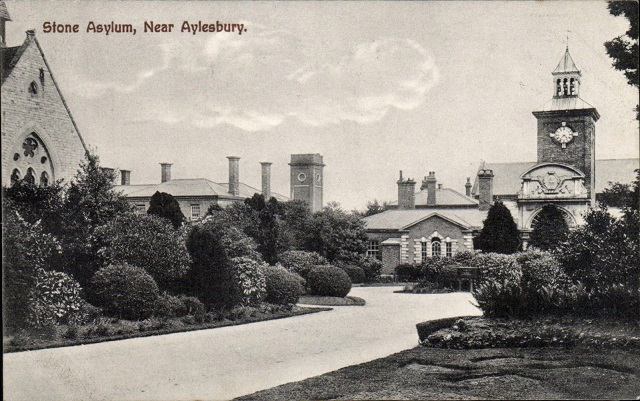
- St John's Hospital

- Shown in Buckinghamshire

Geography
- Location: Stone, Buckinghamshire, England
- Coordinates: 51.8021°N 0.8753°W

Organisation
- Care system: NHS
- Type: Specialist

Services
- Speciality: Mental health

History
- Founded: 1853
- Closed: 1991

Links
- Lists: Hospitals in England

St John's Hospital was a mental health facility at Stone, Buckinghamshire, England.

== History ==
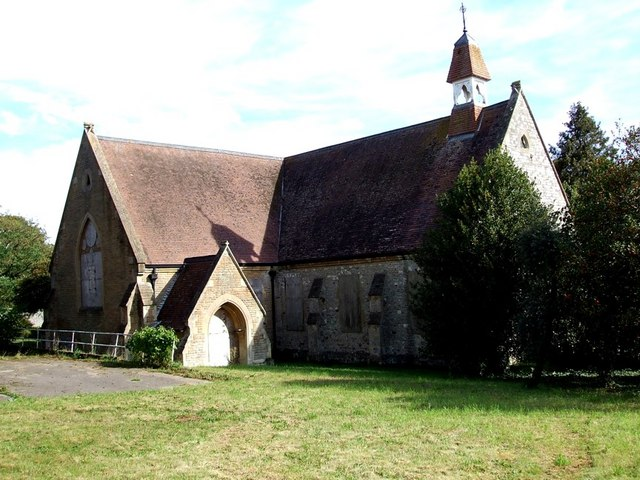
The disused hospital chapel

The hospital, which was designed by Thomas Henry Wyatt and David Brandon using a corridor layout, opened as the Buckinghamshire County Asylum in January 1853.

Additional wings to the main building and a detached chapel were added in the late 19th century.

It became Buckinghamshire Mental Hospital in 1919 and, after additional staff accommodation was built in the 1930s, it joined the National Health Service as St John's Hospital in 1948. An admissions building and a sports and social club were completed in 1959.

After the introduction of Care in the Community in the early 1980s, the hospital went into a period of decline and closed in 1991. Despite extensive local protests, the hospital buildings were subsequently demolished and the site redeveloped for residential use.

The hospital chapel survives and is a Grade II listed building.
