= Theodosius Keene =

British architect

- Born: 1754
- Occupation: Architect
- Years active: 1770–1777
- Notable work: Racton Monument

Theodosius Keene (1754–?), was an English architect who conducted most of his work in the south of England between 1770 and 1777.

== Life and work ==
Theodosius was born around 1754 as the son of notable English architect Henry Keene, famous for his Gothic Revival and Neoclassical buildings.

He designed Racton Monument around 1770, a red brick turreted folly in West Sussex, possibly built as a summerhouse for the nearby Stansted Estate. Racton Monument stands to this day, albeit a ruin. In 1777 he designed the Maidenhead Guildhall, a replacement for the original medieval building which was constructed around 1430. It consisted of a council chamber, assembly room, a corn exchange, a lockup and also held a beer house called the ‘Fighting Cocks Inn’. The guildhall was demolished in February 1963 to make way for the Town Hall. It is also believed that in 1794 he completed Radcliffe Observatory, under the direction of James Wyatt, since his father died before finishing the building.

== Gallery ==
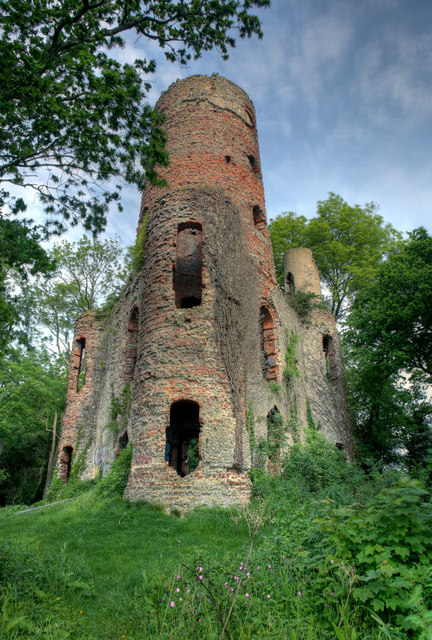
Racton Monument, West Sussex

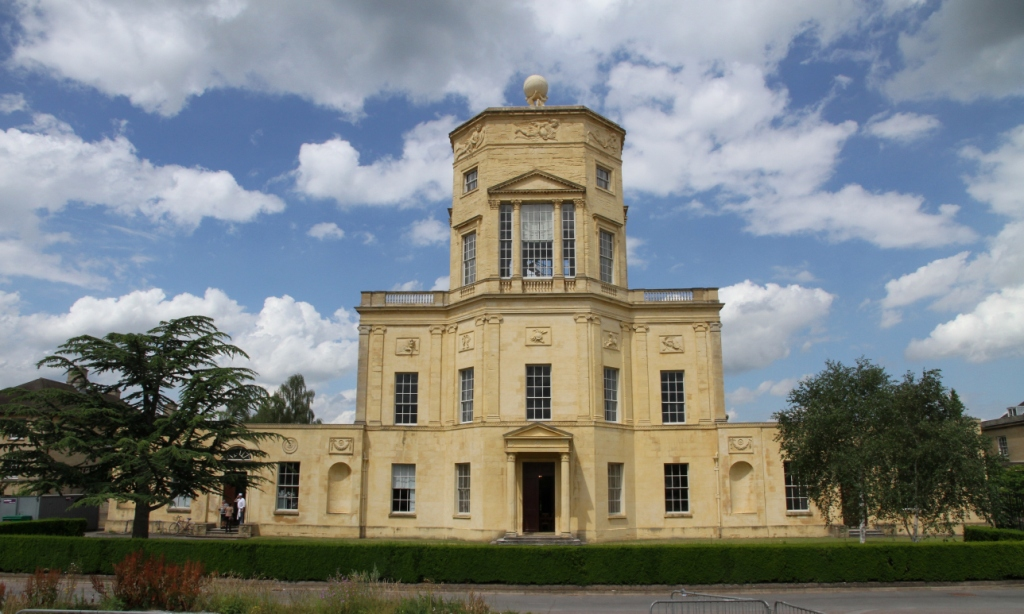
Radcliffe Observatory, Oxfordshire

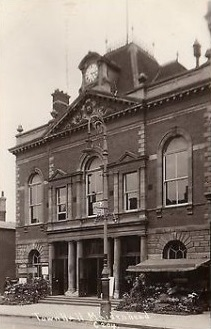
Maidenhead Guildhall, Berkshire
