= Bishopstone, Buckinghamshire =

Village in Buckinghamshire, England

Coordinates: 51.785430°N 0.834867°W

Bishopstone
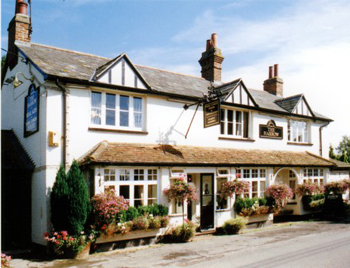
- The Harrow before refurbishment

- Location within Buckinghamshire
- Population: 275
- OS grid reference: SP 80467 10283
- Unitary authority: Buckinghamshire
- Ceremonial county: Buckinghamshire
- Region: South East
- Country: England
- Sovereign state: United Kingdom
- Post town: AYLESBURY
- Postcode district: HP17
- Dialling code: 01296
- Police: Thames Valley
- Fire: Buckinghamshire
- Ambulance: South Central
- UK Parliament: Mid Buckinghamshire

Bishopstone is a small, rural village in the civil parish of Stone with Bishopstone and Hartwell in Aylesbury Vale, Buckinghamshire, England.

== History ==
The village name is a common one in England, and means Bishop's Estate. It is not known to which Bishop this refers though as the village lies within the ancient diocese of Lincoln, it presumedly denotes property owned by the Bishop of Lincoln. The village was first recorded in manorial rolls of 1227 as Bissopeston.

== Location ==
Bishopstone resides amongst farm land just a mile east of Stone and two miles south of Aylesbury. The village is overlooked by the Chiltern Hills, most notably Coombe Hill with its Boer War memorial, a well known Buckinghamshire landmark and viewpoint. Bishopstone is easily accessible from the A418 which runs from Aylesbury to Thame in Oxfordshire.

== Amenities ==
Due to Bishopstone's relatively remote location there is a limited bus service. The closest train stations are located in Aylesbury and at Little Kimble 2.5 miles south. The only pub in the village, The Harrow, was closed for 5 years but re-opened in October 2019 after a total refurbishment of both the grounds and building. There is no village shop; however neighbouring Stone is host to an Indian restaurant, a petrol filling station, antiques store, a grocery store and post office.

== Gallery ==
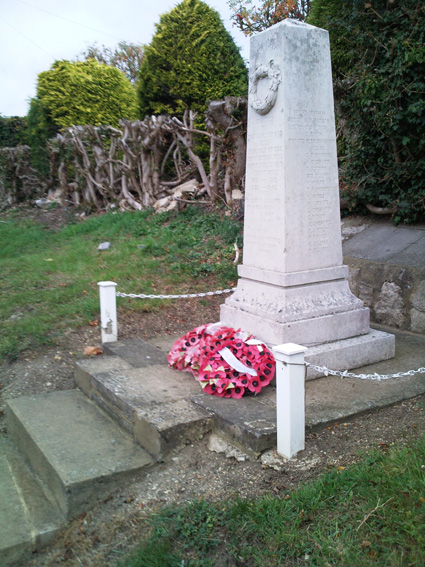
The War memorial on Main Road

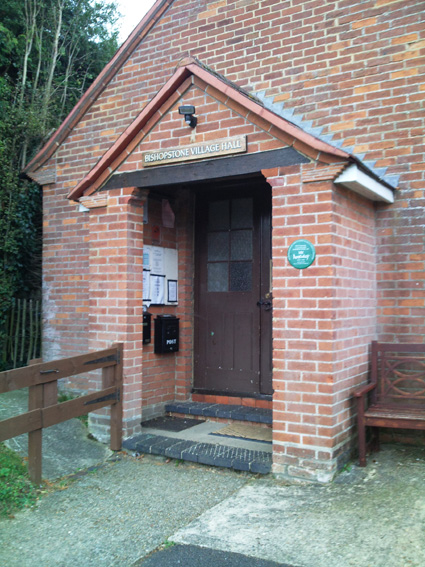
Bishopstone Village hall

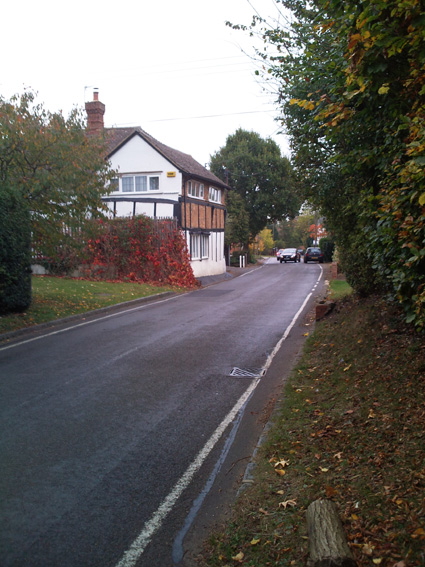
Main Road, Bishopstone

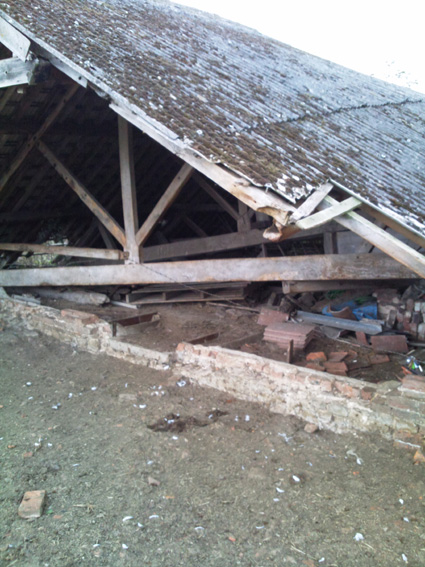
A ruined farm building

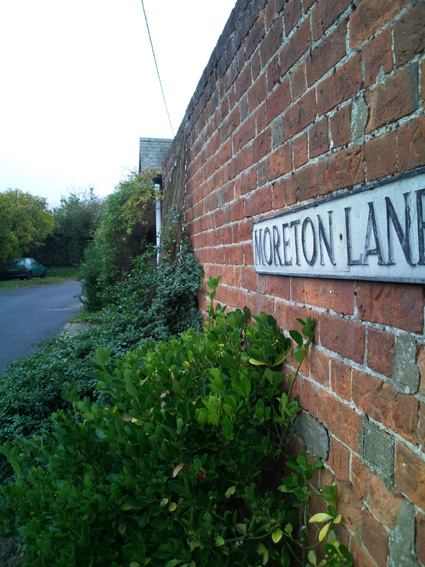
Moreton Lane Street Sign

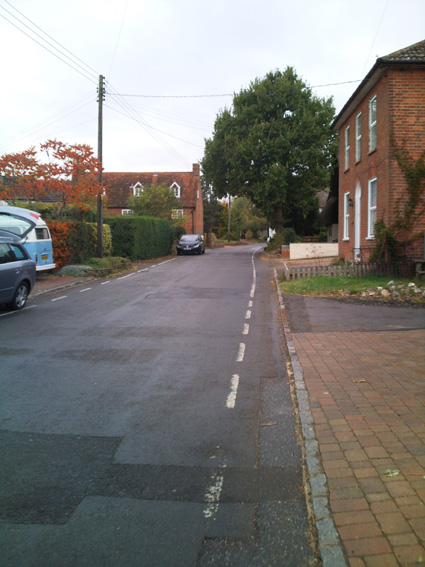
Main Road facing West

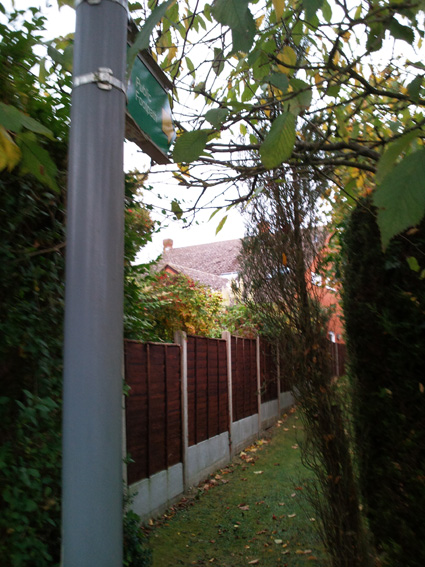
Footpath towards Aylesbury

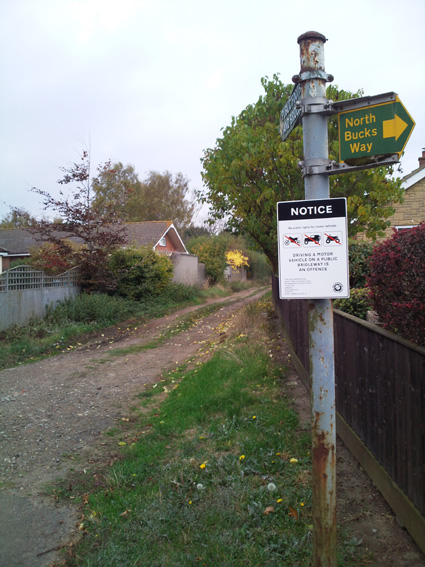
The North Bucks way
