= Hubert Bernards =

American politician

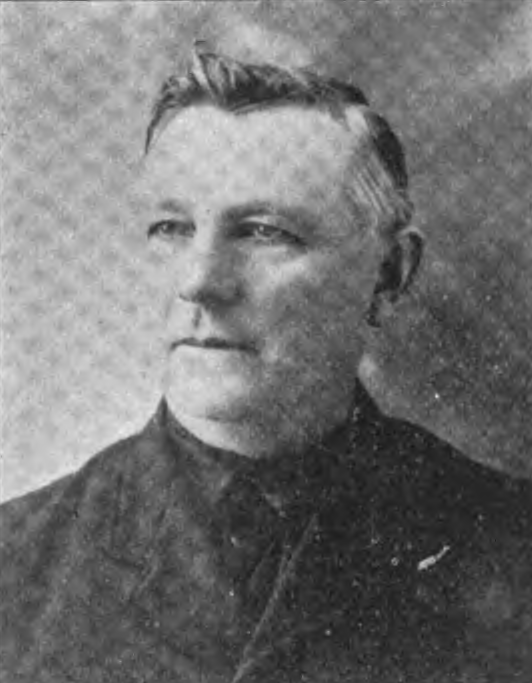

Hubert Bernards was a Democratic representative in the Oregon Legislative Assembly, first elected in 1900 to represent Washington County. He served until at least 1911. A native of the Netherlands, he moved to Wisconsin at age 17 and to Washington County in 1875. He died in 1923.
