= Henry Keene (architect) =

English architect

Henry Keene (15 November 1726 – 8 January 1776) was an English architect, notable for designing buildings in the Gothic Revival and Neoclassical style.

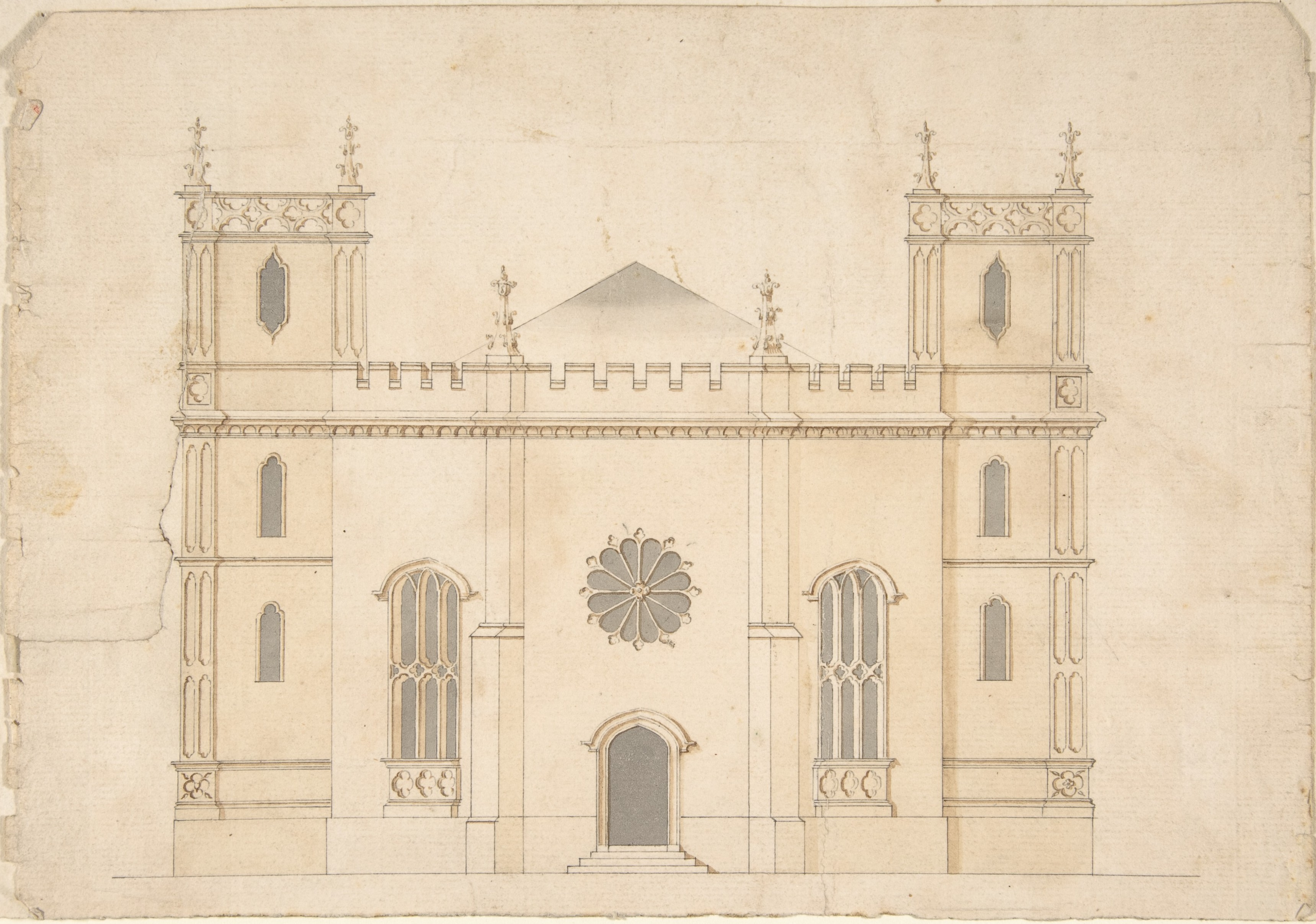
Drawing of a facade of a Gothic Revival church, attributed to Henry Keene, possibly St. Mary's Church in Hartwell, 1750s

== Life and work ==
Keene was born in the London area, and at the age of 20 became Surveyor to the Dean and Chapter of Westminster. Six years later, he was appointed Surveyor of the Fabric of Westminster Abbey. He worked in Ireland at various times between 1752 and 1766, but nearly all his known surviving buildings are in England, especially in London and Oxford, where he had houses, and on various country estates. While much of his work is in the neo-classical style, he was an early exponent of Strawberry Hill Gothic, making good use of his knowledge of the Gothic details of Westminster Abbey. He had a son, Theodosius Keene, who was also an architect and known for designing Racton Monument.

He died at his country house at Drayton Green near Ealing.

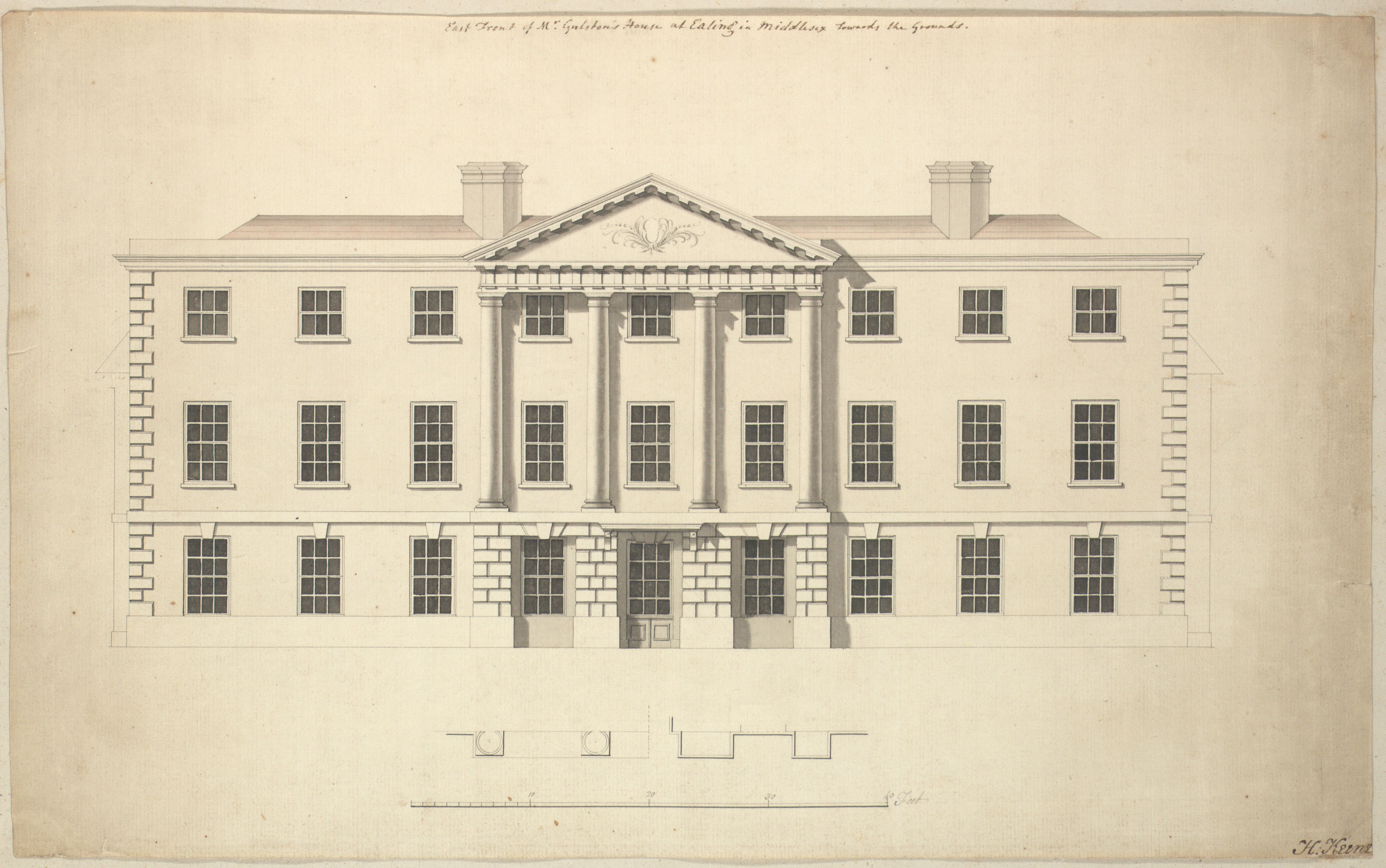
Architectural drawing by Henry Keene of facade of Ealing Grove, built for Joseph Gulston II, 1750s

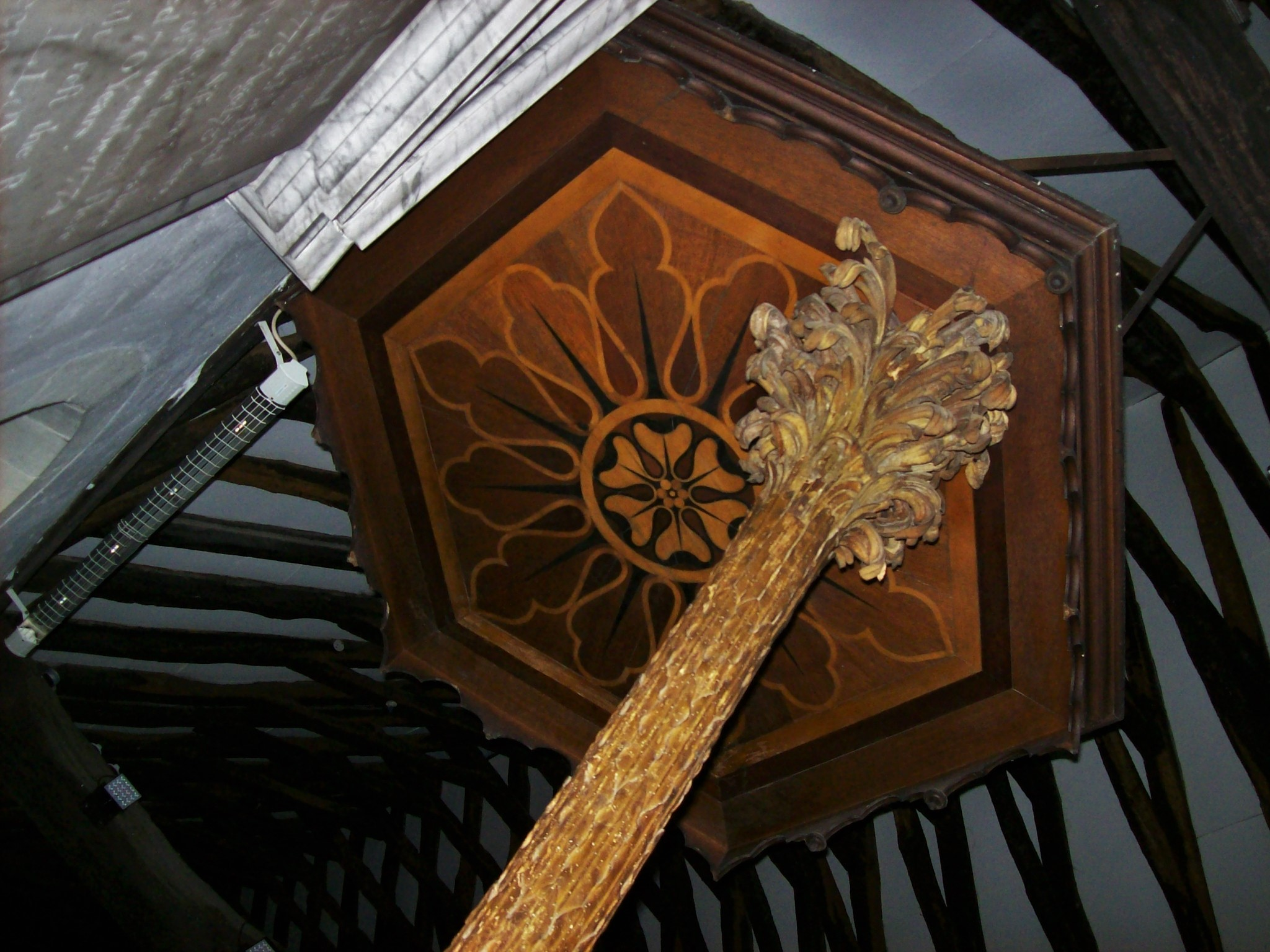
Detail of pulpit at St Peter and St Paul, Trottiscliffe (Henry Keene, 1775, originally in Westminster Abbey)

== Selected buildings still standing ==
- Hartlebury Castle, Worcestershire — refitted the Chapel in the Gothic style, c. 1750
- British Museum, London — renovated Montagu House to house the British Museum,
- Trinity College, Dublin — jointly responsible with John Sanderson for the west front on College Green, 1752–59
- Hartwell, Buckinghamshire — built St. Mary's Church in Gothic style, 1753–55
- High Wycombe, Buckinghamshire — Gothicised All Saints Church, 1754; built the High Wycombe Guildhall, 1757
- Bowood House, Wiltshire — stables, 1754
- Ealing Grove, Middlesex — Palladian house for Joseph Gulston II, 1750s
- Hartwell House, Bucks — rebuilt the east front, etc., 1759–61
- Arbury Hall, Warwickshire — designs for Gothicising commissioned by Sir Roger Newdigate, 1762
- Radcliffe Observatory, Oxford — begun, 1772–76 (completed by Keene's son Theodosius, under the direction of James Wyatt, 1794)
- Worcester College, Oxford — Provost's Lodgings and completion of George Clarke's Terrace, 1773–76
- Vandalian Tower, Harting — folly, 1774
- Westminster Abbey, London — choir and pulpit, 1775; pulpit now located in The Church of St Peter and St Paul, Trottiscliffe, Kent

== Bibliography ==
- Mowl, Tim. "Henry Keene, A Goth in Spite of Himself." In The Architectural Outsiders, edited by Roderick Brown, 82-97. Waterstone, 1985. ISBN 978-0-947752-04-0
- Colvin, H. M. Biographical Dictionary of English Architects 1660-1840. London, John Murray, 1954. ISBN 978-0-7808-0042-7
- Goodall, John. Parish Church Treasures: The Nation's Greatest Art Collection. Bloomsbury Publishing, 2015. ISBN 978-1-4729-1764-5
- Lindfield, Peter. Georgian Gothic: Medievalist Architecture, Furniture and Interiors, 1730-1840. Boydell & Brewer. ISBN 978-1-78327-127-6
- White, Roger. The Architectural Drawings of Magdalen College, Oxford: A Catalogue. Oxford: Oxford University Press, 2015. ISBN 978-0-19-924866-7
