= Stone, Buckinghamshire =

Village in Buckinghamshire, England

Stone
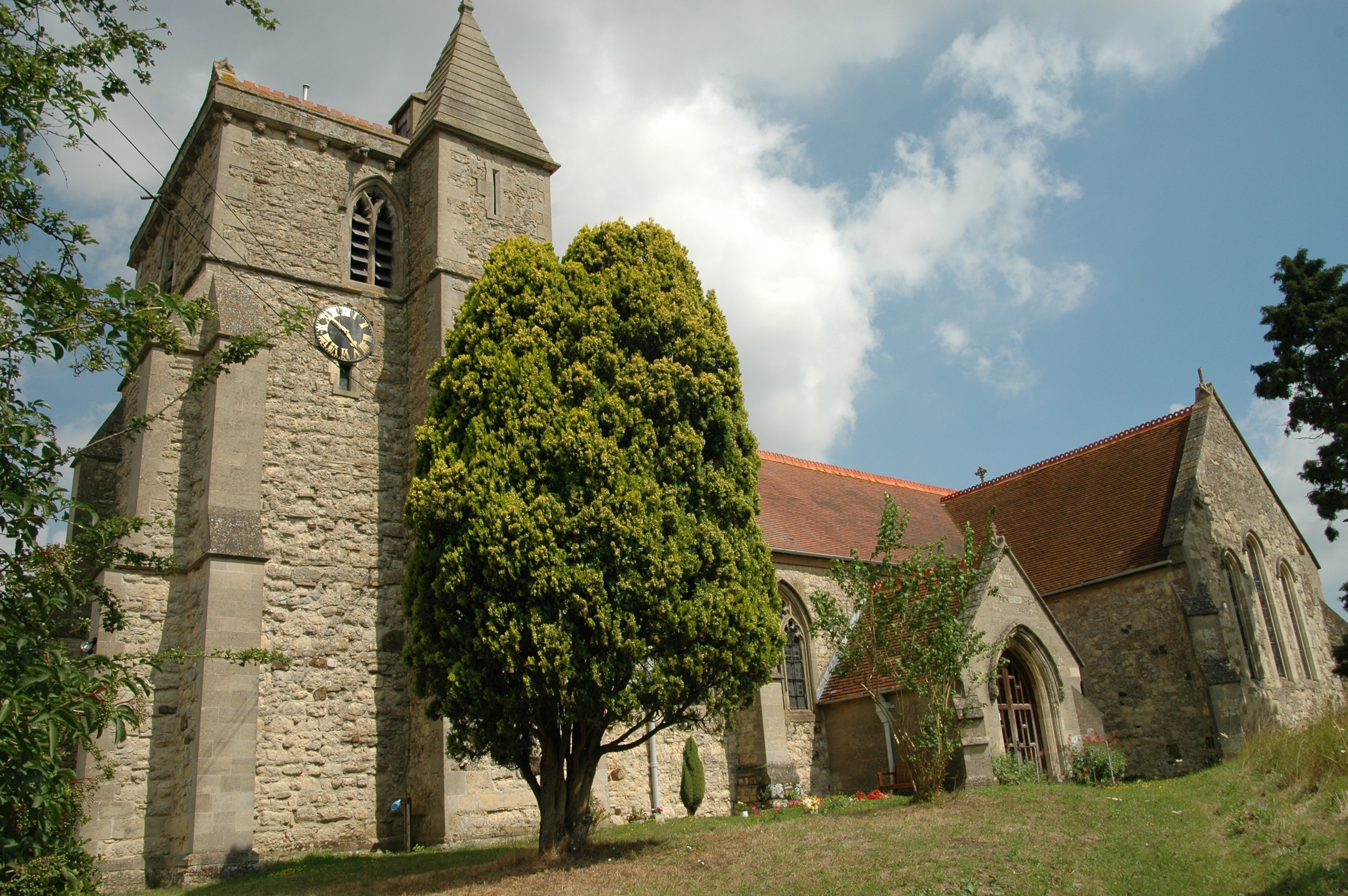
- St John the Baptist parish church, Stone

- Location within Buckinghamshire
- Population: 2,698 (Stone with Bishopstone and Hartwell parish, 2021)
- OS grid reference: SP783123
- Civil parish: Stone with Bishopstone and Hartwell
- Unitary authority: Buckinghamshire
- Ceremonial county: Buckinghamshire
- Region: South East
- Country: England
- Sovereign state: United Kingdom
- Post town: AYLESBURY
- Postcode district: HP17
- Dialling code: 01296
- Police: Thames Valley
- Fire: Buckinghamshire
- Ambulance: South Central
- UK Parliament: Mid Buckinghamshire

Stone is a village in the civil parish of Stone with Bishopstone and Hartwell, in Buckinghamshire, England. It is located southwest of the town of Aylesbury, on the A418 road that links Aylesbury to Thame. As well as Stone, the parish also includes the settlements of Bishopstone and Hartwell. At the 2021 census the parish had a population of 2,698.

The architect Clough Williams-Ellis designed the village hall in 1910. The original dedication stone with his name on is on the south eastern corner of the building.

== Description ==
The village name is Old English in origin, and refers to a boundary stone or marker stone. In the Domesday Book of 1086 the village was recorded as Stanes.

The village of Stone adjoins the village of Hartwell.

The parish church is dedicated to St John the Baptist, and is dated 1273. The graveyard contains the grave of Admiral William Henry Smyth.

=== 1806 description ===
In 1806, Magna Britannia described Stone as

STONE, in the hundred of Aylesbury and deanery of Wendover, lies nearly three miles west of Aylesbury, on the road to Thame. The manor was anciently in the family of Braci, afterwards in that of Whittingham. It has been since held for many years by the Lees with the adjoining manor of Hartwell, and is now the property of the Rev. Sir George Lee bart.

The parish church which was consecrated in 1273, retains some vestiges of the architecture of that period. The rectory was given by the Braci family to the priory of Oseney. By the act of parliament which passed for inclosing this parish in 1776, it appears that the Lees were entitled to the great tithes of Southwarp in Stone, and the earl of Chesterfield to those of the remainder of the parish. Allotments of land were then assigned to the impropriators and to the vicar, who was entitled to the tithes of hay. Sir George Lee is patron and incumbent of the vicarage.

=== Astronomical observatory ===
In 1839, John Lee and the Royal Astronomical Society jointly owned the advowson of the parish. They appointed amateur scientist and Fellow of the Royal Society, Joseph Bancroft Reade as vicar. Reade served as incumbent until 1859, establishing a school and an astronomical observatory, and performing pioneering work in the early development of photography.

=== Village school ===
Stone Church of England Combined School is voluntary controlled, mixed primary school with approximately 200 pupils aged between four and eleven. The school's catchment area includes the nearby villages of Bishopstone and Hartwell, and children transfer to the school from Dinton Church of England School, at the age of seven. The school dates from 1871, but most of the present buildings date from 1973 when a major programme of building work provided a hall, new classrooms, a library, changing rooms, offices and an extended playground. In 2019 the school achieved a 'Good' rating from Ofsted, a rating confirmed in a 2025 inspection.

=== St. John's Hospital ===
In the early 19th century an asylum (later known as St. John's Hospital) was opened in Stone for people with disabilities or mental illnesses. It was closed in 1991, and the vast expanse of land has since been given over to a new housing estate. All that remains are the staff houses and the grade-II asylum chapel.

=== World War II prisoner of war camp ===
During World War II, a Prisoner of War camp was located in Sedrup, a hamlet near Stone (Camp No. 36 Hartwell Dog Track).

The camp housed Italian prisoners from 1942 to 1946 and consisted mostly of tents with one hut. A 1946 RAF aerial photo of the site shows camp buildings at Grid reference SP797121 51.8018°N 0.8454°W, on what is now the Meadoway housing estate adjacent to Sedrup Lane. Remains of the camp were still evident on the site in the 1950s.

== Governance ==
There are two tiers of local government covering Stone with Bishopstone and Hartwell, at parish and unitary authority level: Stone with Bishopstone and Hartwell Parish Council and Buckinghamshire Council. The parish council meets at both the Jubilee Pavilion in Stone and at Bishopstone Village Hall.

Stone was an ancient parish. In 1986 the parish merged with the neighbouring parish of Hartwell to form a new civil parish called Stone with Bishopstone and Hartwell. At the 1971 census (one of the last before the abolition of the parish), Stone had a population of 2138.
