= Racton Monument =

Folly in West Sussex, England

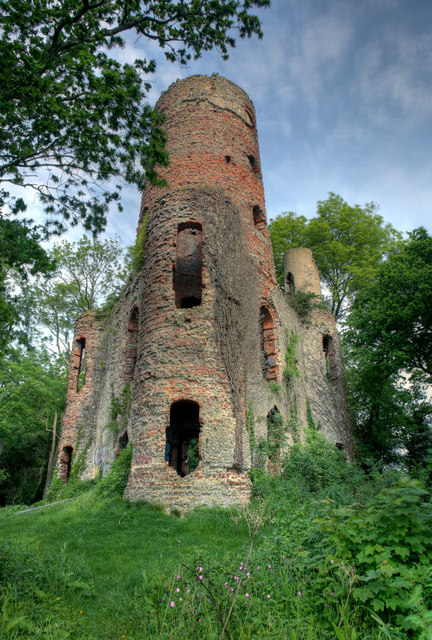
- Multi-turreted triangular tower with much built-up damage

- Location in West Sussex
- 50°52′46″N 0°53′51″W
- Type: Folly
- Location: Racton

History
- Built: 1766–75

Site notes
- Area: Chichester District, West Sussex
- Architect: Theodosius Keene
- Owner: Mark Talbot

Listed Building – Grade II
- Official name: The Racton Monument
- Designated: 5 June 1958
- Reference no.: 1026188

Racton Monument (known locally as Racton Ruin) is a folly on a hill in Racton, West Sussex, England with views over Chichester Harbour and to the Isle of Wight. It was commissioned by the 2nd Earl of Halifax, either as a summerhouse for the nearby Stansted Estate or so he could watch his merchant ships dock at the nearby port, Emsworth, on The Solent. One news report states that the lower level was also to be used for holding banquets.

== History ==
This Grade II listed building was designed by architect Theodosius Keene, son of Henry Keene. It was built between 1766 and 1775 and some sources suggest that it has been called Stansted Castle.

The Listing summary states that the design featured a triangular base, with a round turret at each angle. Of a red brick construction, the building was originally faced with flints and stood four storeys high (24 metres (79 ft)), a height it retains to this day. However, it has been abandoned for over a century and is in a state of ruin, with the floors and much of the original flint facing having disappeared, and its roof caving in.

=== Planned restoration and conversion ===
The property is privately owned by architect Mark Talbot (since 1987). His application for planning permission to turn it into a dwelling was refused in August 2020 by the South Downs National Park Authority. The decision stated that the conversion would lead to an "'unsympathetic form of development', due to the intended scale, design and appearance" and that the owner had provided "insufficient information ... to justify the impact of the proposals", according to a news report.

Planning consent for a conversion to a private dwelling had been provided in 1991 by Chichester District Council, but work did not begin and the consent expired in April 2013. Prior to converting the folly into a residence, Talbot had planned to "replace the missing elements, both structural and decorative, and to refurbish the building as far as practical to match the original design" according to a June 2020 news report.

=== Condition and concerns ===
By February 2012, the tower's condition described as follows: "Flint deterioration (peeling from brick core), particularly bad to South elevation. Severe brick deterioration to west window. Numerous sills dropped".

In 2020, Mark Talbot said that the folly had been "a focal point of 'undesirable and sometimes illegal gatherings' as well as suffering from fly tipping, and dumping of cars". Occult acts were said to have taken place on occasion at the ruined folly. It has drawn paranormal investigators investigating reported paranormal activity. Intrigue surrounds the myth that the folly may have been used by smugglers.

According to Country Life, "it has seen illegal raves, ghost hunts, occultists and graffiti, and was, reputedly, a 19th-century brothel". Local lore suggests "spectral sightings [that] include flying bricks, faces in windows and a ghost tractor that drives up behind you, then disappears".

== Gallery ==
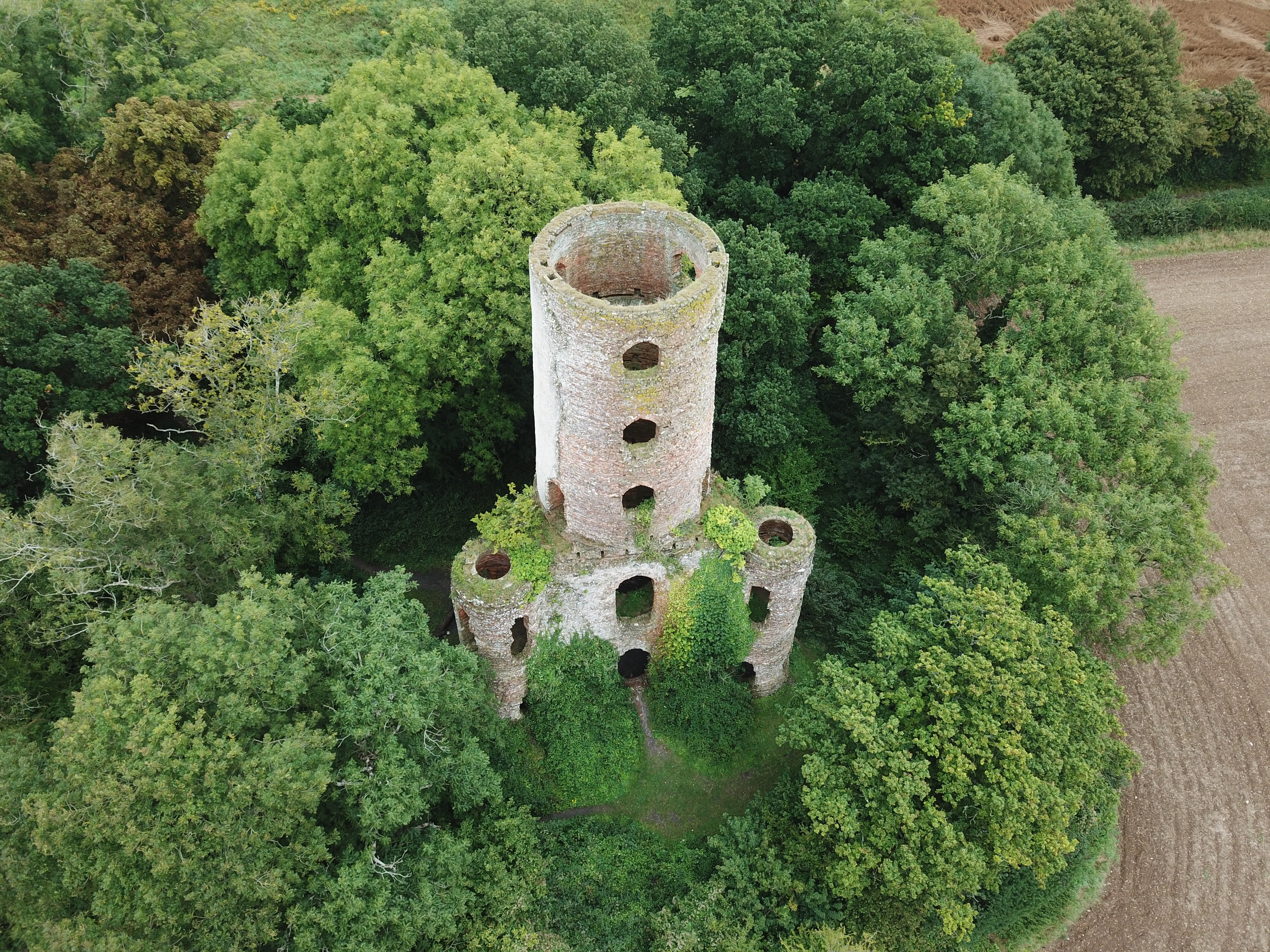
Racton Monument from above

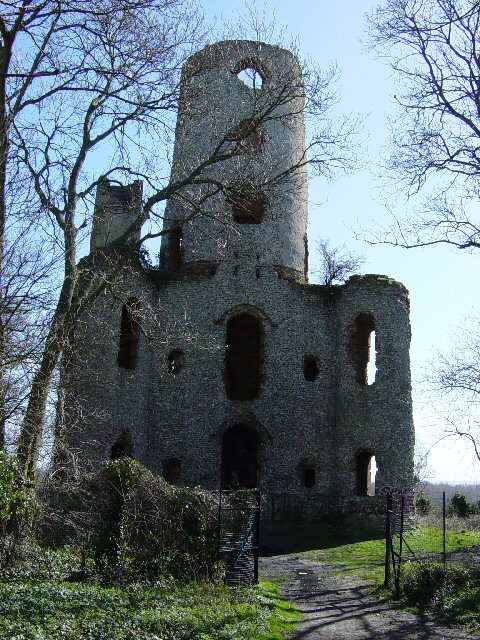
Front of the monument

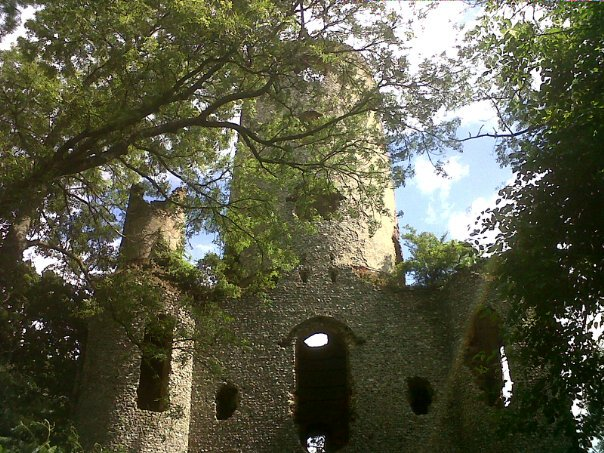
Looking up to the top of the monument

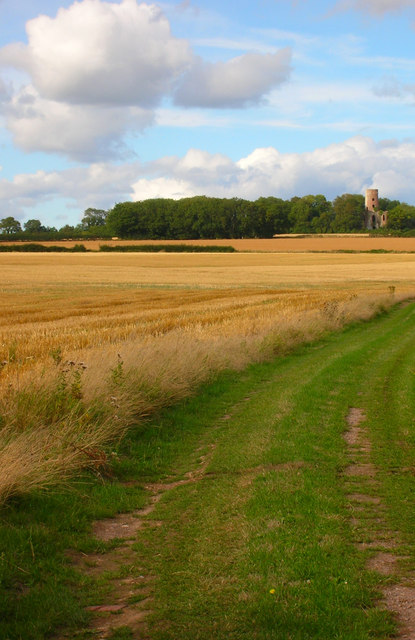
Looking north toward the monument

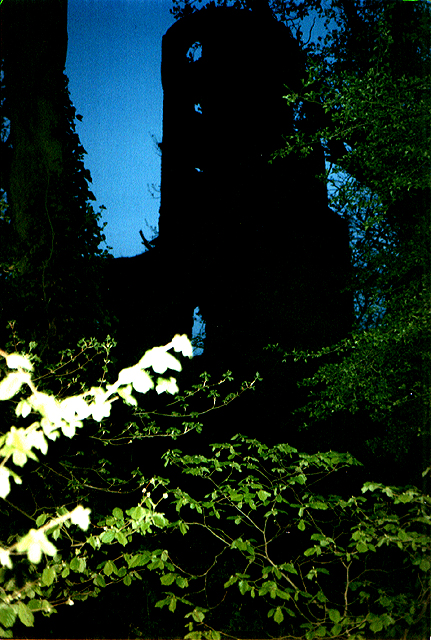
The monument at night
