= James Hemenway (Oregon politician) =

American politician

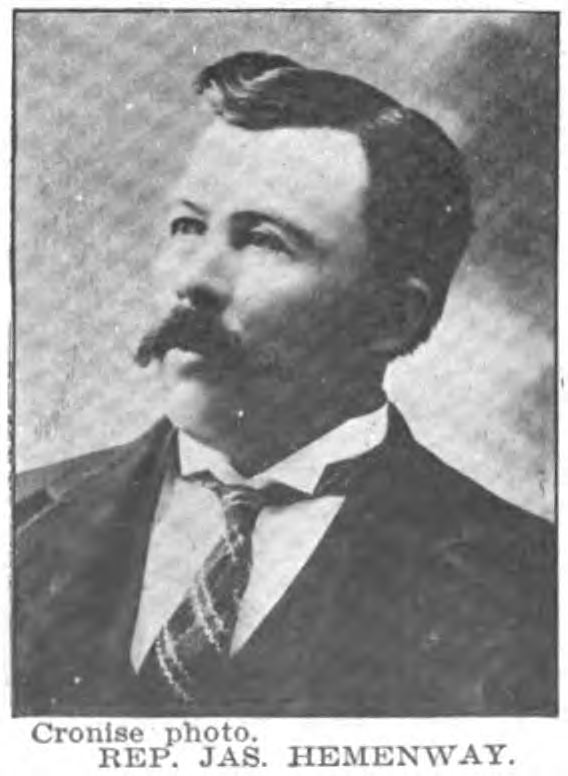

James Hemenway was an American legislator from Cottage Grove in the U.S. state of Oregon, first elected in Lane County in June 1900.
