= Henry Keene (politician) =

American politician

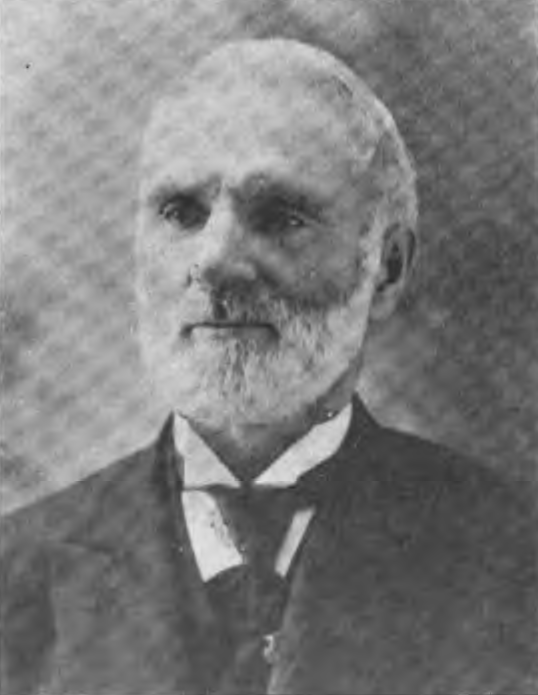
- State representative Henry Keene

Member of the Oregon House of Representatives
- In office 1901–1902
- Constituency: Marion County

Personal details
- Born: December 13, 1830 Saxony, Germany
- Died: October 21, 1912 (aged 81) Eugene, Oregon, U.S.
- Party: Republican

Henry Keene was a Republican legislator in the U.S. state of Oregon, first elected in Marion County in June 1900. He was born in Saxony in 1830 and moved to New York, Minnesota, before moving to Oregon in 1870. His wife was also a native of Germany; they had 13 children.

Keene died on 21 October 1912 at his daughter home near Eugene, Oregon. He was buried at the Stayton Cemetery in Stayton, Oregon.
