= Brocas (disambiguation) =

Brocas is a French commune.

Brocas may also refer to:

Many members of the Anglo-French Brocas family in Beaurepaire, Hampshire:

- Sir Barnard or Bernard Brocas (1330–1395)
- Sir Barnard or Bernard Brocas (rebel) (executed 1400) his son
- Barnard Brocas, Esq. (d. before 1834) collector, owner of the Brocas helm
- Henry Brocas (1762–1837), Irish landscape painter
- Thomas Brocas (fl. 1390–1404), English MP
