= Clewer =

Coordinates: 51°29′06″N 0°37′37″W

- Village
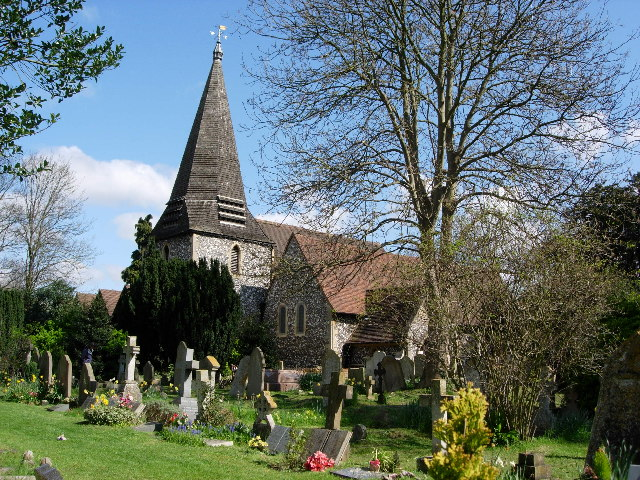
- St Andrew's Church

- Location within Berkshire
- OS grid reference: SU954772
- Unitary authority: Windsor and Maidenhead
- Ceremonial county: Berkshire
- Region: South East
- Country: England
- Sovereign state: United Kingdom
- Post town: WINDSOR
- Postcode district: SL4
- Dialling code: 01753
- Police: Thames Valley
- Fire: Royal Berkshire
- Ambulance: South Central
- UK Parliament: Windsor

Clewer /ˈkluːər/ (also known as Clewer Village) is an ecclesiastical parish and an area of Windsor, in the ceremonial county of Berkshire, England. Clewer makes up three wards of the Royal Borough of Windsor and Maidenhead, namely Clewer North, Clewer South and Clewer East.

== History ==
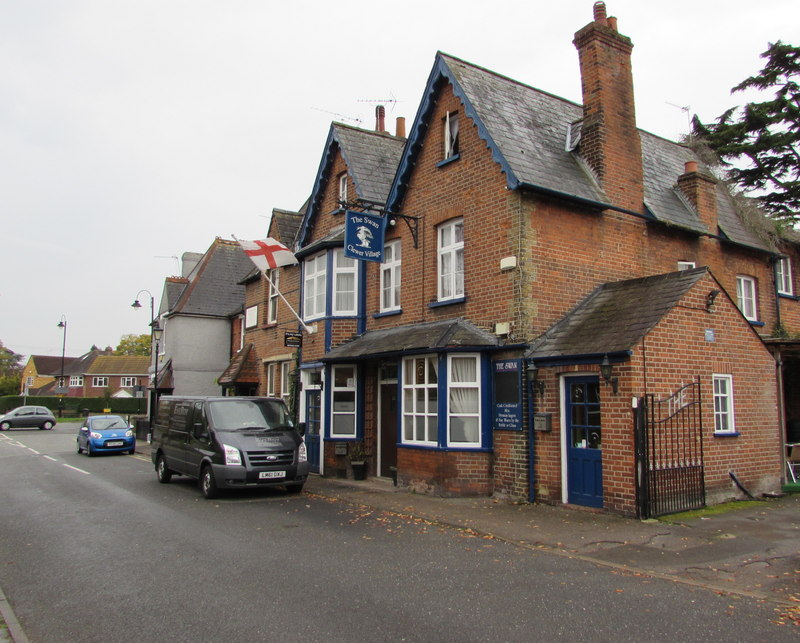
The Swan pub, Clewer Village

The name Clewer comes from the word Clifwara meaning "cliff-dwellers", and is named after those who lived below the hill on which Windsor Castle was built. Historically, Clewer pre-dates New Windsor and still exists as a separate ecclesiastical parish. A Saxon settlement existed there, and it is thought that the settlement of Clewer may have grown up at a place where the river Thames could be forded. A wood-and-thatch Saxon church is believed to have existed on the site of the present church. The surviving font is thought to be Saxon, and is presumed to have belonged to the earlier church. Until the 1850s this font was in an improbable position at the west end of the north aisle and it is likely that it had never been moved from its position in the earlier Saxon church.

By the time of the Norman Conquest, there was a Manor of Clewer, mentioned in the Domesday Book as Clivore and recorded as having a church and mill. It was from here that William I took the lands on which he built his fort, which became Windsor Castle. The Manor of Clewer continued to receive a rent of 12 shillings per annum from the Crown for this land until the 16th century. The present St Andrew's Church is of Norman construction and it is traditionally believed that William I habitually attended mass there, as there was no chapel within the original castle. It has a 14th-century chantry chapel to the memory of the second wife of the hero of the Hundred Years' War, Sir Bernard Brocas. The family lived in the sub-manor of Clewer Brocas until rebellious activities obliged them to retreat to obscurity at Beaurepaire in Sherborne St John.

The Clewer Park area of Clewer Village is where the former home of Sir Daniel Gooch once stood. It was at Clewer that Charles Thomas Wooldridge murdered his wife Laura Ellen; the execution of Wooldridge in 1896 was immortalised in Oscar Wilde's The Ballad of Reading Gaol. Hatch Lane is the site of the former Community of St John Baptist, sometimes known as the Clewer Sisters; the convent closed in 2001 when the community moved to Oxfordshire.

In 1891 the civil parish had a population of 9766. In 1894 the parish was split with the part in New Windsor Municipal Borough becoming Clewer Within and the rural part becoming Clewer Without.

The Swan pub in the village dates from the 18th century and was rebuilt in the 1860s. It has been community-owned since 2018.

== Notable residents ==
- Brian Brindley, Anglo-Catholic canon and later convert to Roman Catholicism; curate of St Andrew's, Clewer, 1962–67
- Sir Bernard Brocas, 14th-century English commander
- Sir Bernard Brocas Junior, early 15th-century rebel
- Sir Michael Caine, actor; lived at the Old Mill House, Clewer Village.
- Sir Daniel Gooch, 19th-century railway engineer, lived at Clewer Park
- Natalie Imbruglia, singer, has lived on White Lilies Island for several years
- Peter Osgood, footballer
- Jimmy Page, guitarist. Page's Led Zeppelin bandmate John Bonham died at Page's home in Clewer in 1980, resulting in the band's disbandment.
- Ethel "Bip" Pares (1904–1977) book illustrator
- Mariquita Tennant (1811–1860) social reformer

== See also ==
- Clewer Mill Stream
- Clewer Park

== Sources ==
- Raymond South: The Book of Windsor, Barracuda Books, 1977, ISBN 0-86023-038-4
