= Brocas helm =

15th century jousting helmet

The Brocas helm is a jousting helm on display at the Rotunda as part of the Tower of London armoury collection. It was commissioned by an English knight from an Italian armourer.

It is named after the Anglo-Norman Brocas family of Beaurepaire, Hampshire descending from the knight Sir Barnard Brocas (1330–1395). The collection of the family was auctioned after the death of a later Barnard Brocas, as the "Brocas Sale" in 1834.
