= The Vyne Chapel =

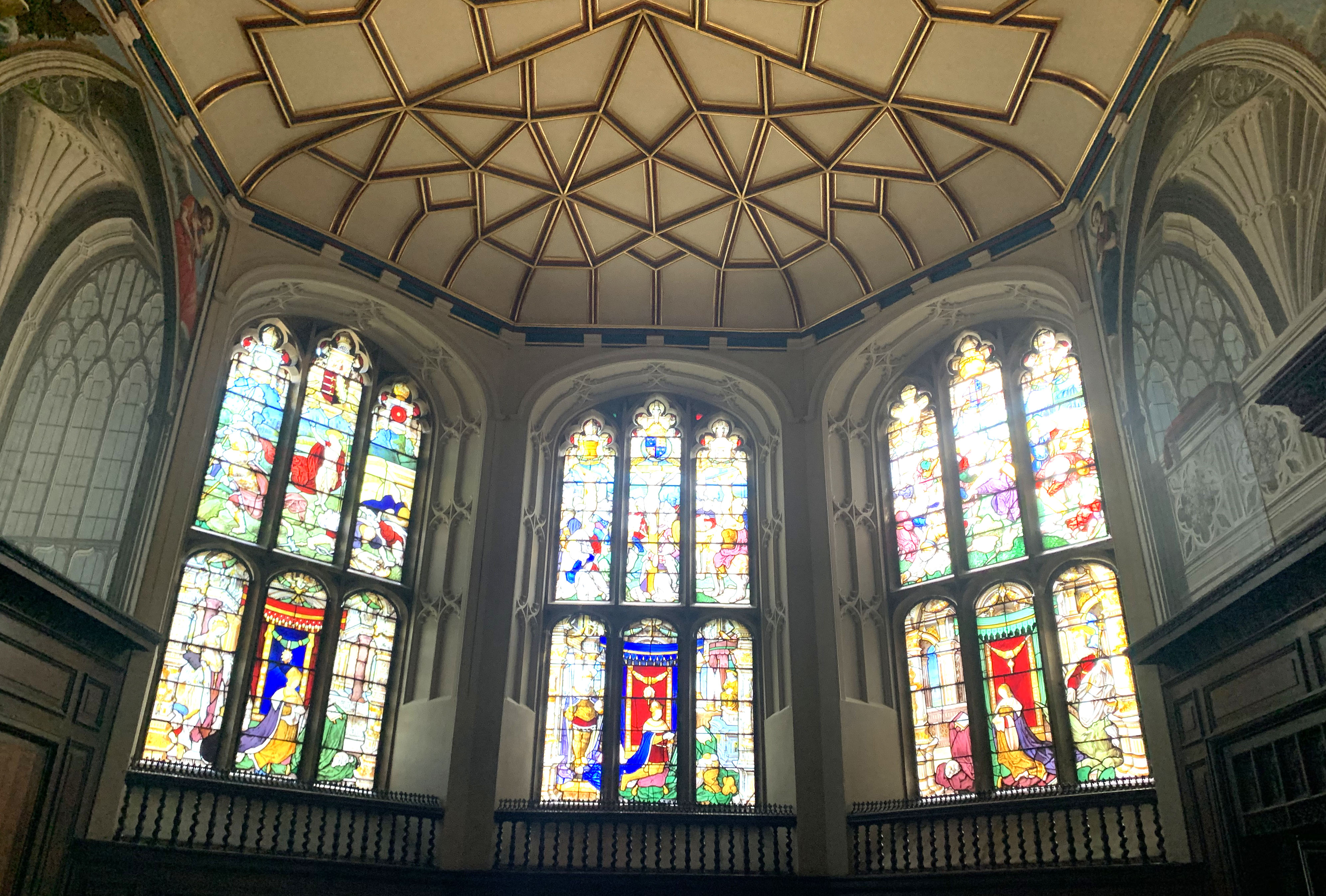
- Interior of The Vyne Chapel, The Vyne
- The Vyne Chapel
- 51°18′26″N 1°05′18″W
- OS grid reference: SU 63641 56837
- Location: The Vyne, Hampshire
- Country: England
- Denomination: Church of England

Architecture
- Heritage designation: Grade I listed
- Style: Early Modern

Administration
- Parish: Sherborne St John

The Vyne Chapel is a Grade I listed Church of England chapel in The Vyne, Hampshire. The chapel's origins are early modern. The chapel is noted for its well preserved 16th century stained glass, featuring a rare portrait of a young King Henry VIII of England, his sister Margaret Tudor and Henry's wife Catherine of Aragon, all in prayer.

== History ==
The Vyne Chapel forms part of The Vyne, a 16th-century country house in the parish of Sherborne St John, near Basingstoke, in Hampshire, England. The chapel is noted for its rare 16th century stained glass. The upper panels of the glass show scenes from the passion of Christ; the lower panels contain portraits of King Henry VIII, his first wife Catherine of Aragon, and Henry's sister Margaret Tudor, Queen of Scotland, all kneeling in prayer, together with their respective patron saints. Henry VIII was a guest at The Vyne both with his first wife Catherine of Aragon and later with Anne Boleyn.

At the time The Vyne was owned by the Lord Chamberlain William Sandys, 1st Baron Sandys, a key figure in the Tudor Royal Household, who commissioned the glass sometime before 1533. Sir William Sandys' chapel measures 35 feet in length, 19 feet in width, and 25 feet in height.

=== Reformation ===
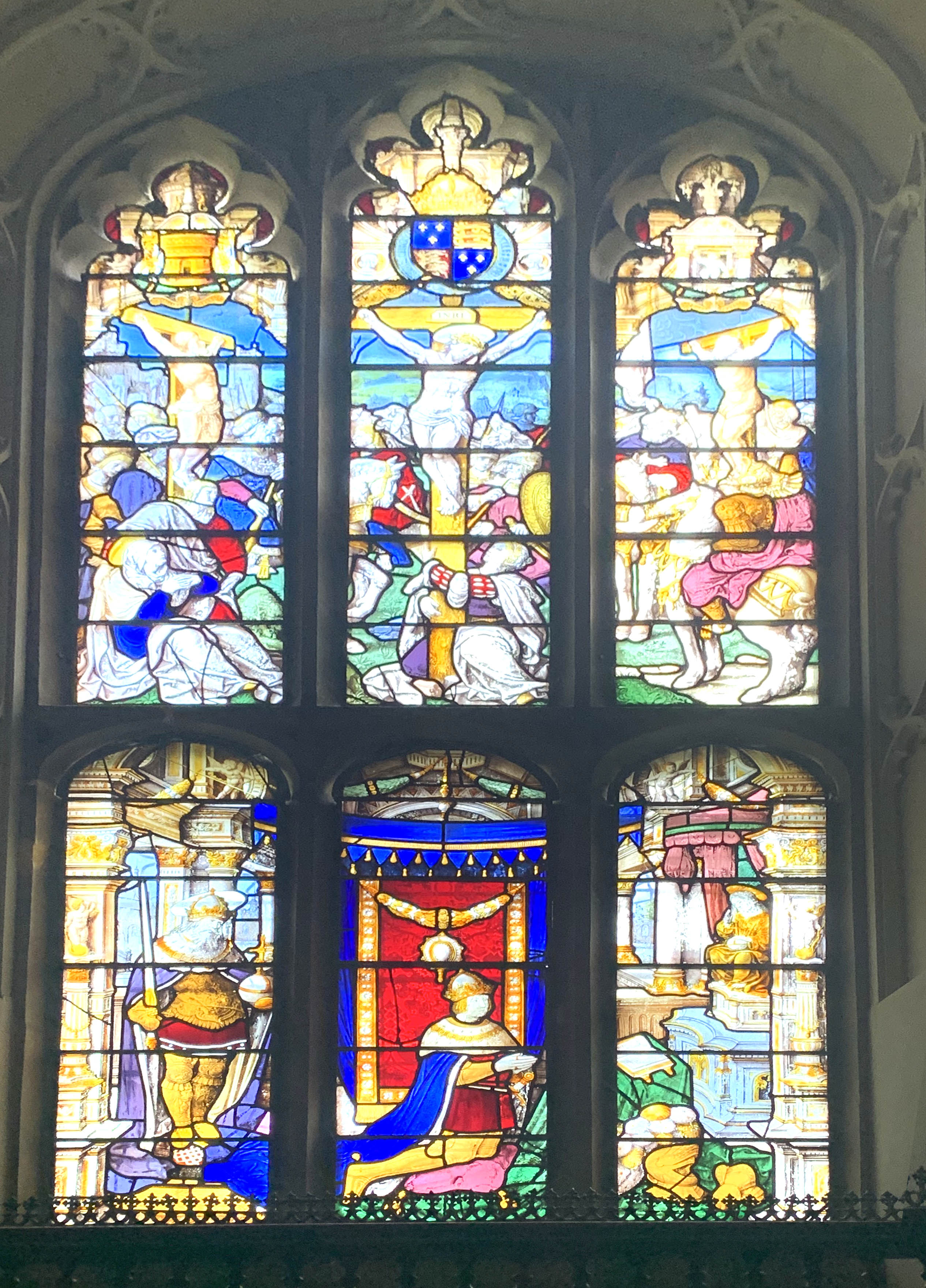
Henry VIII Window in The Vyne Chapel

It remains unclear how the glass survived the iconoclasm of the Reformation in England. It may be that the presence of the three royal figures prevented the glass from being destroyed.

The chapel was described by the art historian and antiquarian Horace Walpole as "the most heavenly chapel in all the world".

=== Modern era ===
In 2015 the stained glass windows underwent restoration to preserve them from damage. The windows were removed, cleaned and re-fitted with protective glazing

== Today ==
The Vyne Chapel is well preserved and is open to visitors to The Vyne; however the chapel no longer has regular services. The stained glass windows are considered the most important stained glass in the collection of the National Trust, arguably amongst the most important in the country.

== See also ==
- Grade I listed buildings in Hampshire
- The Vyne, Hampshire
