= Holy Trinity Church, Theale =

Church in Berkshire, England

Holy Trinity Church
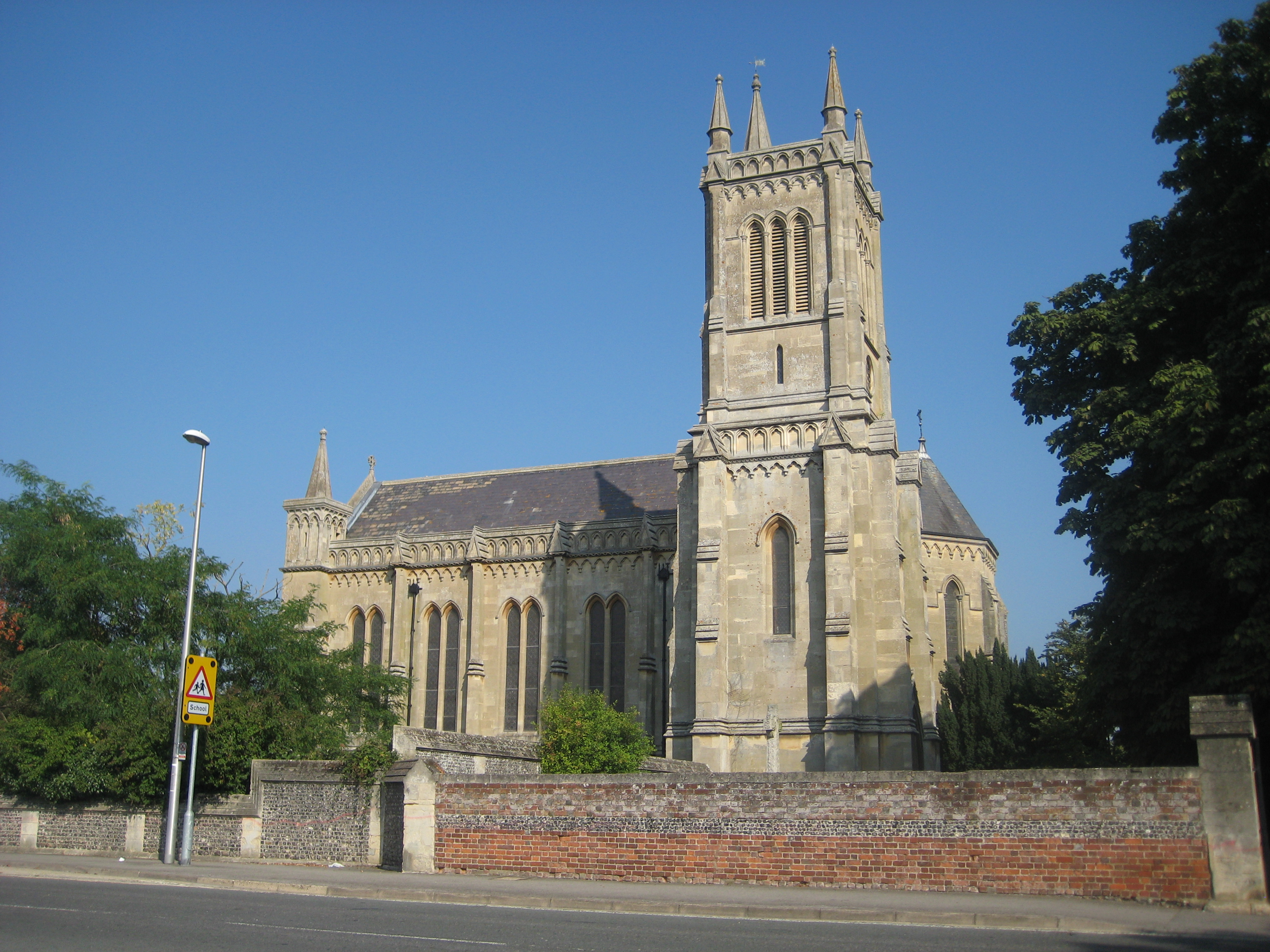
- Holy Trinity Church from the south, with churchyard wall

- Location in Berkshire
- 51°26′13″N 1°04′49″W
- OS grid reference: SU 64027 71290
- Country: England
- Denomination: Anglican
- Website: Church website

History
- Status: Church
- Founder: Sophia Sheppard
- Dedicated: August 21, 1832

Architecture
- Functional status: Active
- Heritage designation: Grade I
- Designated: 14 April 1967
- Architect: Edward Garbett
- Architectural type: Early English

Specifications
- Materials: Bath stone

Administration
- Diocese: Oxford

Clergy
- Rector: Martin Davy

Holy Trinity Church is a Church of England parish church in Theale, Berkshire, in the Diocese of Oxford. It was completed in 1832 in the Early English style, influenced by Salisbury Cathedral. The church is a Grade I listed building.

== History ==
In 1799, Rev Thomas Sheppard, rector of Tilehurst built a new chapel of ease, at that time Theale was still part of the parish of Tilehurst. The chapel was built of brick, had a bellcote, and was situated to the south-west of the present church. Rev Sheppard died in 1814, having wished for a new parish church to be built to replace his earlier building. The benefactor enabling this was his widow, Sophia, who donated £39,000 for the building of a church, rectory and premises for the school, though other sources state that the donation was closer to £50,000. Sophia was supported in the founding of the church by her brother, the famous Oxford classical scholar Martin Routh, rector of Tilehurst from 1832 to 1854. As a result, the advowson of the new church was granted to Magdalen College, Oxford where Routh was master.

The church was designed in the Early English style by Edward Garbett, a local architect also responsible for the Holy Trinity Church in Reading. It was consecrated on 21 August 1832 by the Bishop of Salisbury, having taken about 15 years to build. The dedication is to the Holy Trinity. Routh appointed Edward Ellerton as curate of the new church, so the new parish was only formally instituted in 1855, immediately after Routh had died. The chancel apse was added in 1892 by John Oldrid Scott. The church interior was then decorated with murals by George Frederick Bodley. Much of this decoration was destroyed in the restorations of 1946 and 1965.

== Architectural analyses ==
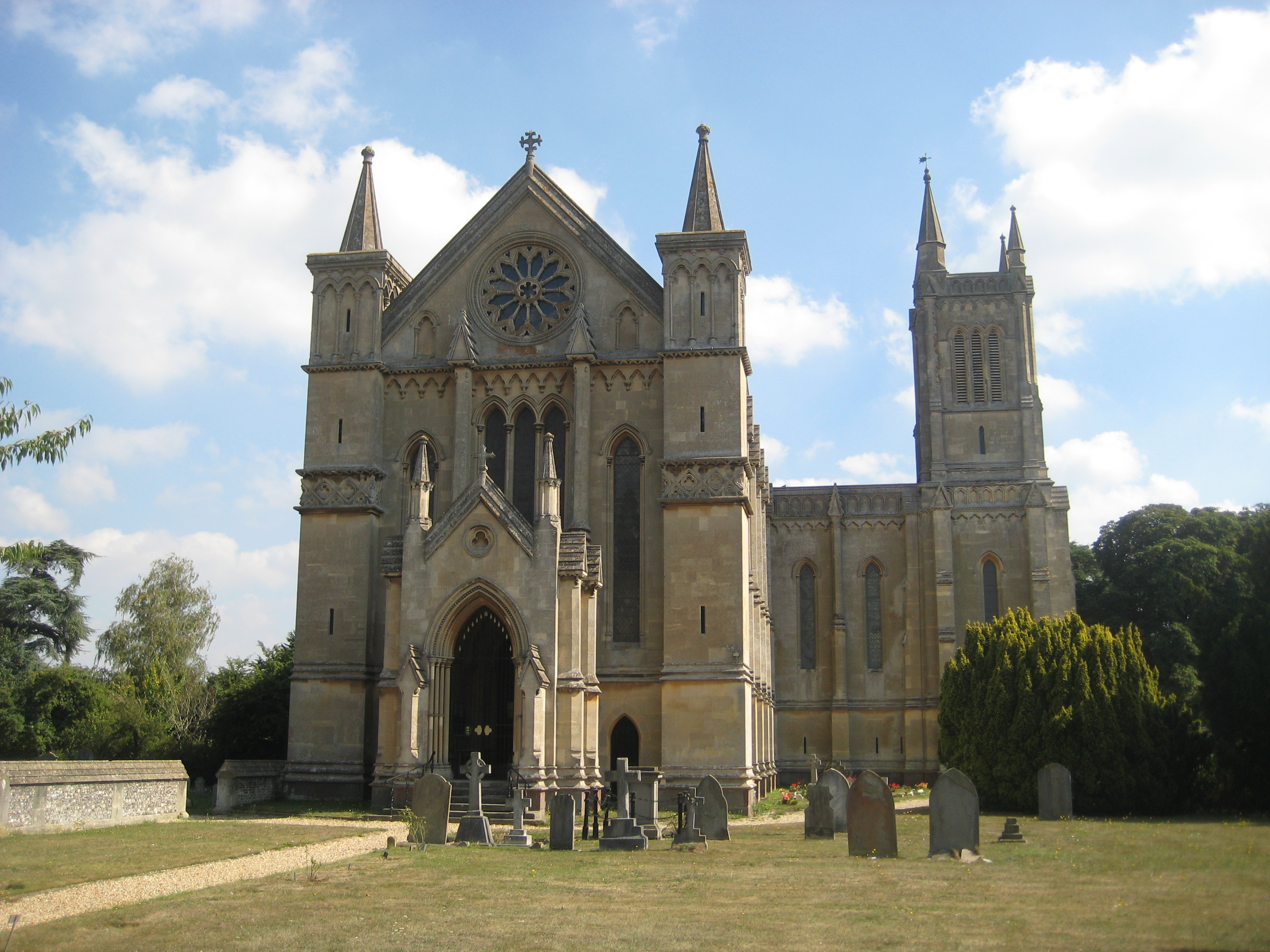
Holy Trinity Church, west front.

The church, especially as regards the western façade and the buttresses, bears resemblance to Salisbury Cathedral. Nikolaus Pevsner wrote that the church was modelled on the cathedral. In 1833 John Claudius Loudon described the body of the church as "satisfactory", and wrote that "the tower, and all the turrets, and terminations to the buttresses, are too short". The church has been compared to the now-demolished church of St George in Newtown, Birmingham, owing to the designers' use of existing architecture, rather than "forcing their own inventions". The bell tower is not part of the church edifice but is positioned to the south-east of the nave, with suggestions that its building was an afterthought. However, John Buckler built the tower between 1827 and 1828, with suggestions that he modelled the building on Salisbury's bell tower – demolished about 30 years previously – though little artistic and architectural evidence supports this.

== Description ==
=== Exterior ===
The church consists of a tall and narrow nave, without aisles, of six bays, a five-sided apsidal chancel with an octagonal sacristy to the north, to the west, a porch and a detached bell tower to the south-east. The nave bays are separated by prominent buttresses, with false pinnacles incorporated into their structures. The first four bays each have a pair of tall lancet windows in each side wall, but the last two bays have singletons. The façade is flanked by a pair of thin towers crowned with spirelets, and with blind arcades at their tops. The spirelets are echoed by a pair of tall pinnacles on the far corners of the nave. The frontage in between the towers is divided into three by a further pair of buttresses, the central zone having a triple lancet window and the two side zones, singletons. Above, a large rose window lights the void in between the vault and the roof. The porch is lofty, with a pair of pinnacles and a trefoil window above the pointed arched portal.

The chancel apse is lower than the nave, and has a single lancet window in each of its five sides. The octagonal sacristy is very unusual, and imitates medieval octagonal chapter houses such as at Westminster Abbey. The tower is in three stages, the first incorporating an archway for a footpath. The belfry is lighted by triple lancet windows. Crowning it is a moulded parapet, with pinnacles at the angles - one is much larger than the other three. The tower is connected with the south wall of the chancel by a narrow range of the same height as the nave, lighted on the east and west sides respectively by two lancet windows. This has been called the "library". The fabric is in Bath stone, brought in by the Kennet and Avon Canal.

=== Interior ===
The nave ceiling consists of a plaster rib vault in six bays, springing from engaged stone vaulting shafts rising from the floor. Geometric coloured stencilling from the mostly destroyed 1892 Bodley scheme of mural decoration has been restored on the vault. At the west end is a gallery supported by two rows of stone columns, with moulded capitals and bases, the eastern or front row having clustered shafts, from which spring pointed arches. The soffit of the gallery is groined in plaster. The nave floor is in Minton tiles. Tall lancet windows light the interior, paired in the first four bays and single in the last two. The semi-octagonal apse has a massive triumphal arch. It has lancet windows above a trefoiled blind arcade, and a vault with radial ribs. The near side walls have murals of angels, remnants of the Bodley decorative scheme. The brass eagle lectern was a gift of the local Blatch family of brewers.

==== Waynflete Chantry ====
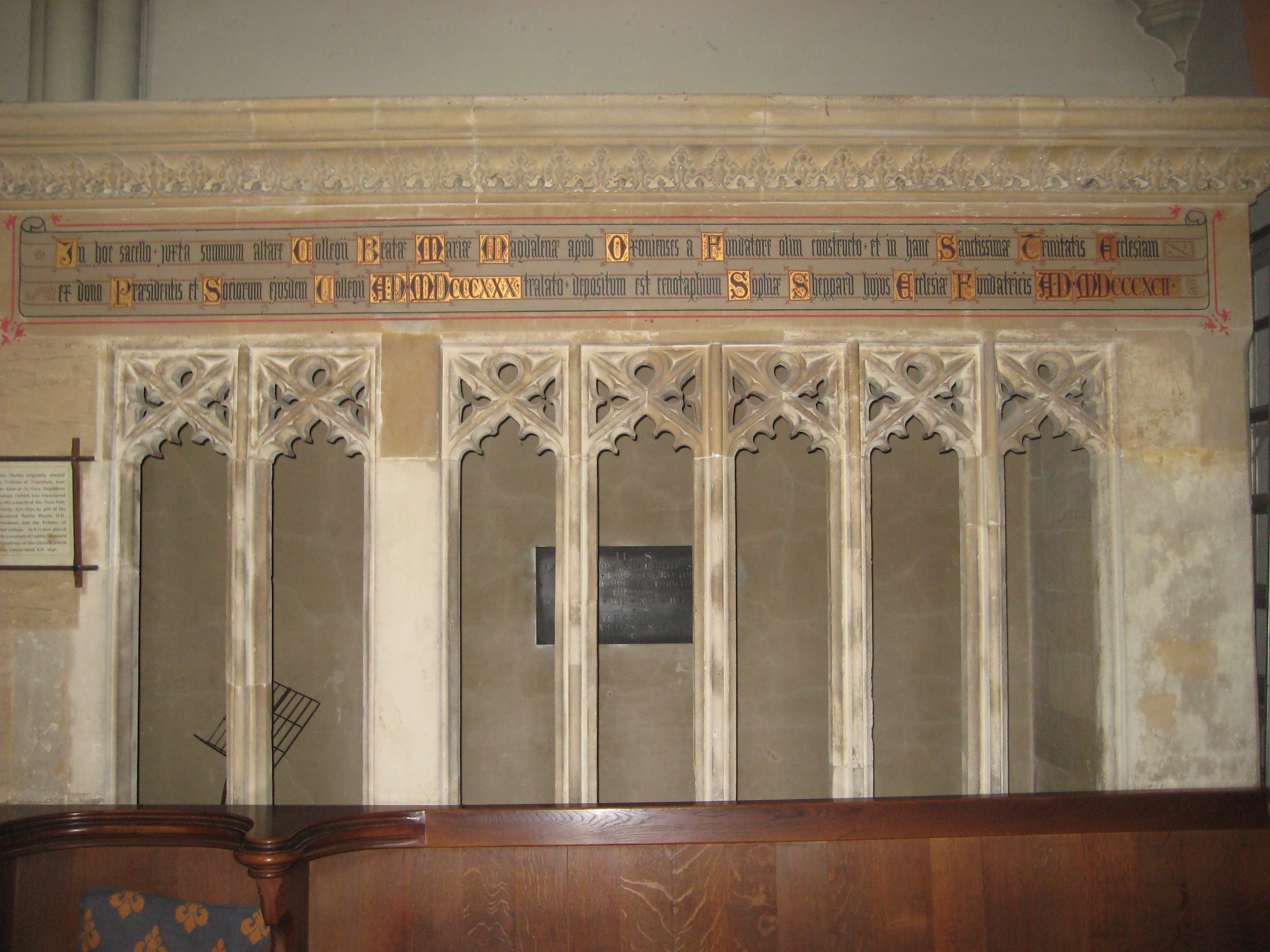
The Chantry Chapel of William Waynflete

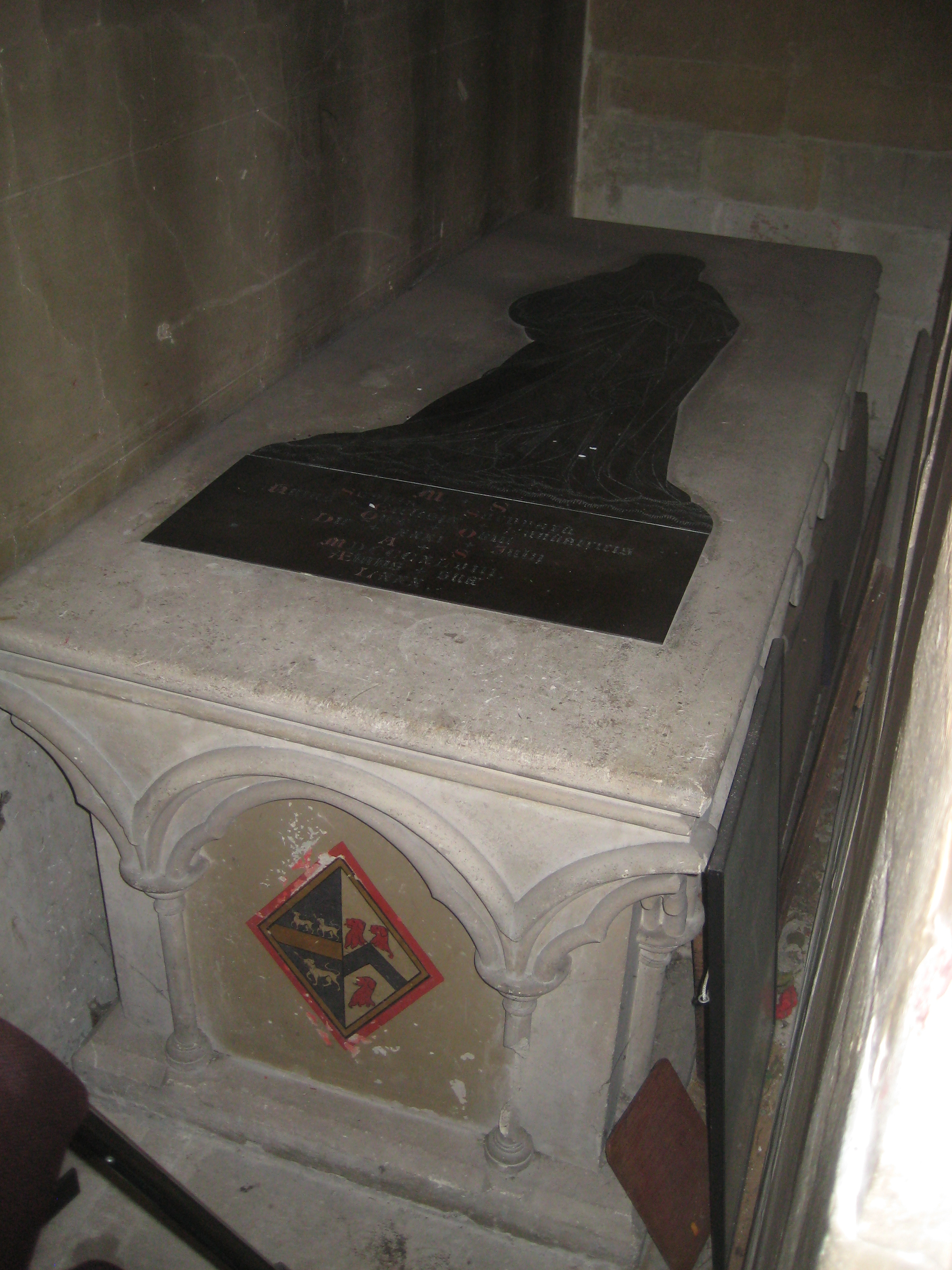
The Cenotaph of Sophia Sheppard

In the far left side of the nave is the chantry of William Waynflete, the founder of Magdalen College, removed from the chapel of that college in 1830 and appropriated as the memorial of Mrs. Sophia Sheppard, at whose expense the church was erected. The chantry is a long, narrow structure, roofed by a four-centred barrel vault with molded ribs. In the south side are two windows, the eastern of five and the western of two cinquefoiled lights with tracery within square heads. The doorway has molded jambs and a straight-sided four-centred arch within a square head with traceried spandrels. On the west side is a traceried panel similar to the windows. Above this is a shield of Wayneflete's arms. The doorway to the vestry and a doorway built into the interior face of the north-west wall of the nave appear to be of similar date, and were probably brought here from Magdalen College chapel at the same time. The late 19th-century epigraph, in Gothic script, reads in Latin:

In hoc sacello, juxta summam altare Collegii Beatae Mariae Magdalenae apud Oxoniensis a Fondatore olim constructo et in hanc Sanctissimae Trinitatis ecclesiam ex dono Praesentis et Sociorum ejusdem Collegii AD MDCCCXXX tralato, depositum est cenotaphium Sophiae Sheppard hujus ecclesiae Fundatricis AD MDCCCXCII.

In this shrine, erected by the Founder next to the high altar of the College of Blessed Mary Magdalen at Oxford and moved to this church of the Holy Trinity by the gift of the Present and Fellows of the same College in 1830, the cenotaph of Sophia Sheppard, the founder of this church, was placed 1892.

Sophia's cenotaph is a chest tomb with a medieval-style brass inset in the top.

=== Organ ===
The church's original organ had a single manual and was built by R. W. Rouse of Somerton. It was restored in 1933 by G. H. Foskett of London, with funds donated by the Blatch family. The restoration saw the organ moved from its original position in the church's west end to the nave, with preservation of the pipes. A second restoration was undertaken by Richard Bower of Weston Longville.

== Churchyard ==
The churchyard walls and gate are separately listed by Historic England. The low main wall has very fine flint knapping with decorative stone panels and a gabled stone coping in three shallow steps. Either side of the entrance gateway the wall is higher, with a middle flint band between courses in brick. The original wrought iron gate has piers matching the main wall coping. To the west, the school wall was part of the same design, with piers now lacking gates and a wall also with a central band of flint. The school was part of the same architectural ensemble as the church, but it has been seriously altered and it, with its wall, is not listed. The churchyard has been extended to the north. The original part has been denuded of its tombstones, but a chest tomb for Caroline Webb, died 1831, survives and is listed, Grade II, despite having lost its iron railings.

== Rectory ==
In contrast to the Gothic church, the very large original rectory (now the Old Rectory) is a two-storey building in a Neoclassical style. It is built in Bath stone, with a slate hipped roof - the slate would have come by sea to Bristol from north Wales, then by canal. The stone door-case has a pair of columns in the Doric order, supporting a triglyph frieze and triangular pediment. The original coach house, now the Old Rectory Cottage, is in the same style. Both edifices are Grade II listed buildings.
