= Combermere Barracks =

Military installation in Windsor, England

- Windsor
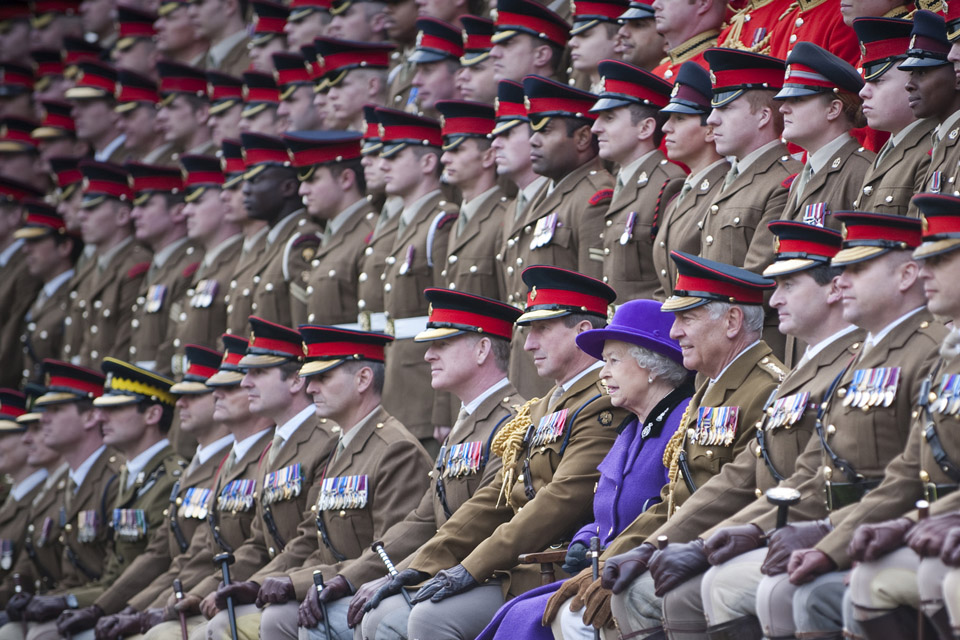
- Queen Elizabeth II with soldiers of the Household Cavalry at Combermere Barracks

Site information
- Type: Barracks
- Owner: Ministry of Defence
- Operator: British Army

Location
- Location in Berkshire
- Coordinates: 51°28′24″N 0°37′2″W

Site history
- Built: 1804
- Built for: War Office
- In use: 1804-Present

Garrison information
- Occupants: Welsh Guards

Combermere Barracks, Windsor is a British Army installation 0.9 miles (1.4 km) from Windsor Castle.

== History ==
Windsor Barracks Act 1867
- Act of Parliament
- Parliament of the United Kingdom
- Long title: An Act for extinguishing certain Rights of Way over and along Barrack Lane in the Borough of New Windsor in the County of Berks.
- Citation: 30 & 31 Vict. c. 109
- Territorial extent: United Kingdom

Dates
- Royal assent: 20 August 1867
- Commencement: 20 August 1867 (Note: Section 1.)
- Repealed: 5 November 1993
Other legislation
Repealed by	Statute Law (Repeals) Act 1993

Status: Repealed

Text of statute as originally enacted

The original barracks, known as Clewer Barracks, were designed to accommodate the Royal Horse Guards and were built at Clewer Park between 1796 and 1800. Queen Victoria ordered the replacement of the barracks, after a personal visit in 1864 exposed to her its unhygienic conditions. The new barracks, which cover over 20 acres (8 ha), were named after Field Marshal Lord Combermere and include a riding school which was built in 1881.

The barracks were renovated in 2006 and became the home of the Household Cavalry Regiment.

The Household Cavalry Regiment moved from Combermere Barracks to Bulford Camp in May 2019. No. 18 Troop and the training wing remained in Windsor.

The 1st Battalion, Welsh Guards moved into the barracks and joined the London District to start their ceremonial duties.

== Based units ==
The following notable units are based at Combermere Barracks.

=== British Army ===
Household Cavalry

- Household Cavalry Regiment
  - Royal County Of Berkshire Army Cadet Force No.18 Troop
  - Training Wing

Royal Armoured Corps

- The Royal Yeomanry
  - 3 Troop, C (Kent and Sharpshooters Yeomanry) Squadron – Windsor (Army Reserve)

Guards Division

- 1st Battalion, Welsh Guards (Public Duties battalion under London District)
  - Headquarters Company
  - No.1 (Prince of Wales')
  - No.2 Company
  - No.3 (Little Iron Men) Company
  - Support Company
