= The Vyne =

Country house in Hampshire, England

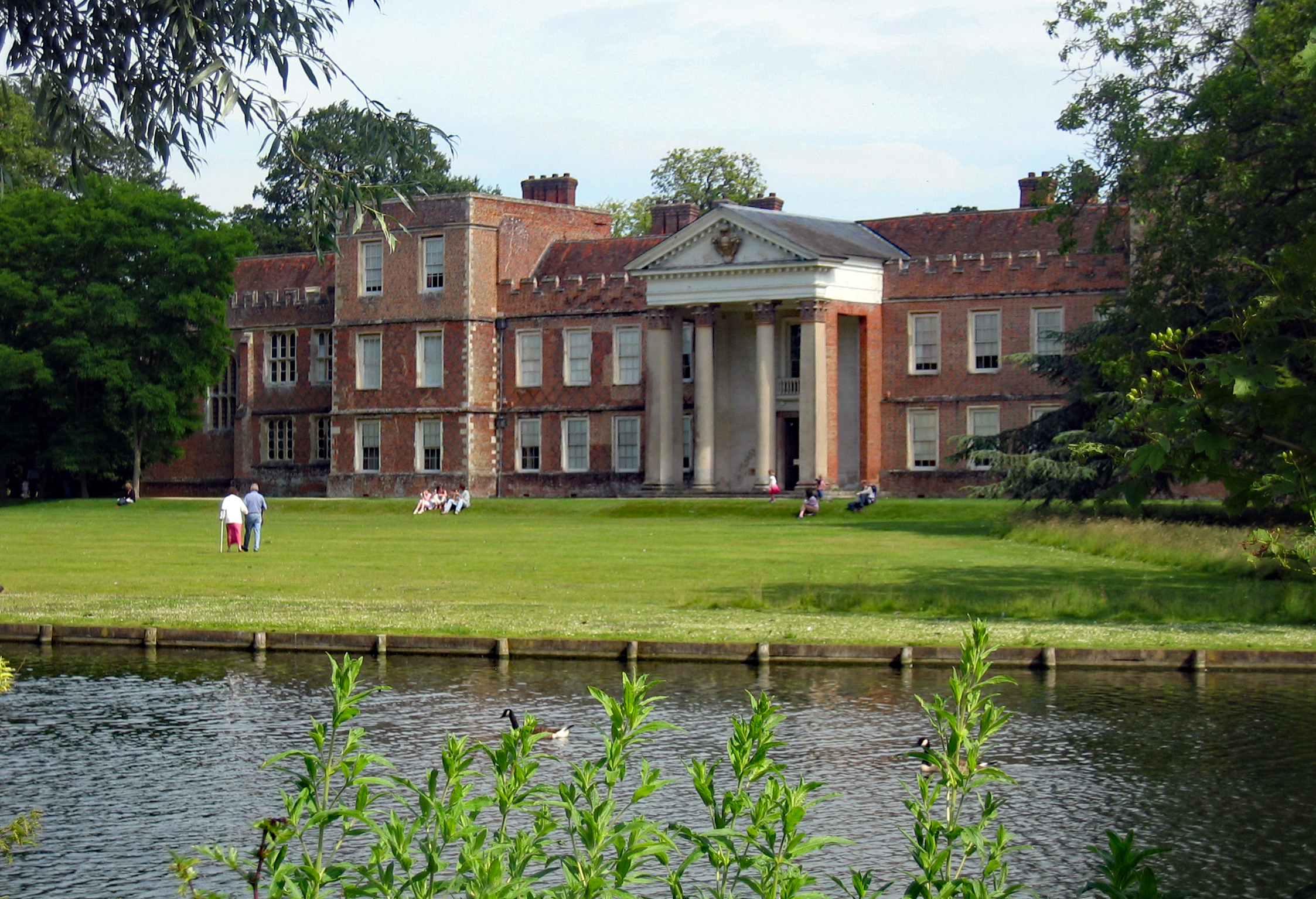
- View of the north front

- Location within Hampshire
- 51°18′25″N 01°05′19″W
- Type: Country house
- Location: Sherborne St John, Hampshire
- OS grid reference: SU 63627 56816

History
- Built: 1500–1520
- Rebuilt: 17th, 18th and 19th centuries

Site notes
- Architect: John Webb (1650s)
- Owner: National Trust

Listed Building – Grade I
- Official name: The Vyne
- Designated: 26 April 1957
- Reference no.: 1296972

The Vyne is a Grade I listed 16th-century country house in the parish of Sherborne St John, near Basingstoke, in Hampshire, England. The house was first built circa 1500–10 in the Tudor style by William Sandys, 1st Baron Sandys, Lord Chamberlain to King Henry VIII. In the 17th century it was transformed to resemble a classical mansion. Today, although much reduced in size, the house retains its Tudor chapel, with contemporary stained glass. The classical portico on the north front was added in 1654 to the design of John Webb, a pupil of Inigo Jones, and is notable as the first portico in English domestic architecture.

In the mid-18th century the house belonged to John Chaloner Chute, a close friend of the architectural pioneer Horace Walpole, who designed the principal stair hall containing an imperial staircase the grand scale of which belies its true small size. In 1958 The Vyne was bequeathed by Charles Chute to the National Trust.

== Nomenclature ==
The Vyne stands on the site of a medieval manor house of the same name. The origins of the name, earliest preserved on a document dated 1268, are uncertain; one theory suggests that it refers to Vindomis, a Roman road station, whilst another that it was the site of the first domestically grown vines in England. In its early history the house and its precincts were often referred to as "The Vyne Green", possibly because the small manor house, its detached chapel and assorted outbuildings were arranged around a square, much like a village green. This assortment of buildings was gradually linked to form one large dwelling, the origins of the present house.

== History ==
In the fourteenth century the house then on the site was the manor house of Sherborne Cowdray, held by the Fyffhide family. Following the death of Sir William Fyffhide the manor was leased to Gregory of Basingstoke until 1370, when the house was described as comprising "a hall, adjoining chambers and the grange and chapel at the house."

In 1386 the manor passed by marriage into the Sandys family; in 1420, again by marriage, it passed to the Brocas family, and in 1488 returned to Sandys, the family most closely associated with the early history of the mansion. The Sandys family rose to prominence during the reign of King Henry VIII, and was founded by William Sandys, 1st Baron Sandys, a royal servant and courtier, who served as Lord Chamberlain from 1526 until his death in 1540. He transformed the medieval manor house into a vast mansion befitting his exalted rank. Successive generations of the Sandys family held the manor. William Sandys, 3rd Baron Sandys (d. 1623) entertained Queen Elizabeth I at the house twice, in 1569 and 1601. Having joined the insurrection of the Earl of Essex he was imprisoned and fined £5,000, when the house passed temporarily into the hands of the crown. Although the house was restored to the Sandys family, their fortunes entered decline and no member was to hold high office again. During the Civil War the house was the residence of the Cavalier Colonel Henry Sandys and following the fall of nearby Basing House, a Royalist stronghold, the Vyne was occupied by Parliamentarians. Colonel Sandys died of his wounds following the Battle of Cheriton and nine years later, in 1653, his son William 6th Baron sold The Vyne to Chaloner Chute, a prosperous lawyer and later MP. (Note: William 6th Baron retired to Mottisfont Abbey, which had been acquired and developed by his ancestor William 1st Baron.)

=== The Chute family ===
The Chute family were to own The Vyne from 1653 until the mid twentieth century, and it is they who are largely responsible for the house as it appears today. The Vyne's purchaser, Challoner Chute, chosen Speaker of the House of Commons on 27 Jan 1659, instigated at The Vyne a program of demolition and rebuilding, sweeping away much of the Sandys' great Tudor mansion and transforming what remained into a smaller classical house. At first glance, Chute's chosen style resembles Palladianism; a form of architecture which had briefly been popular on England before the Civil War, but following the cessation of the war had been dismissed as Royalist. Indeed, Inigo Jones who had introduced the style to the English court had been captured at the fall of nearby Basing House, and taken prisoner, naked and humiliated, from the house as it was looted. So it is surprising that Chute, a prominent Parliamentarian, chose to rebuild his house in an unfashionable style, but also chose as his architect, John Webb, a former pupil of Jones.

In the 18th century, Chaloner's descendant John Chute (Note: His inheritance was unexpected as he was the youngest of ten children.) undertook significant renovations to the house, including a new interior to the chapel, the construction of the tomb and the installation of the staircase. John's Chute's design choices were influenced by the ideas of his friend Horace Walpole, with whom he became acquainted while staying at the home of Horace Mann in Florence in the 1740s. He died childless in 1776 and the estate passed to his cousin Thomas Lobb, who took the name Chute. Lobb made no significant alterations during his ownership of the house. He was likewise without heir and again the inheritance was settled in 1837 on a cousin named William Wiggett, who also took the name Chute. William Wigget's renovation efforts on the estate were focused on the farmland and the roof rather than the interior of the house On his death in 1879 the house passed to his son Chaloner W. Chute.

In 1888 Chaloner W. Chute published A History of The Vyne, covering the story of the estate, its occupants and collections through the centuries. The house remained in the Chute family until it was given to the National Trust in 1956 by Sir Charles Chute. His bequest included the house, its contents and 1124 acres of land, along with an endowment.

== Architecture ==
=== 16th century ===
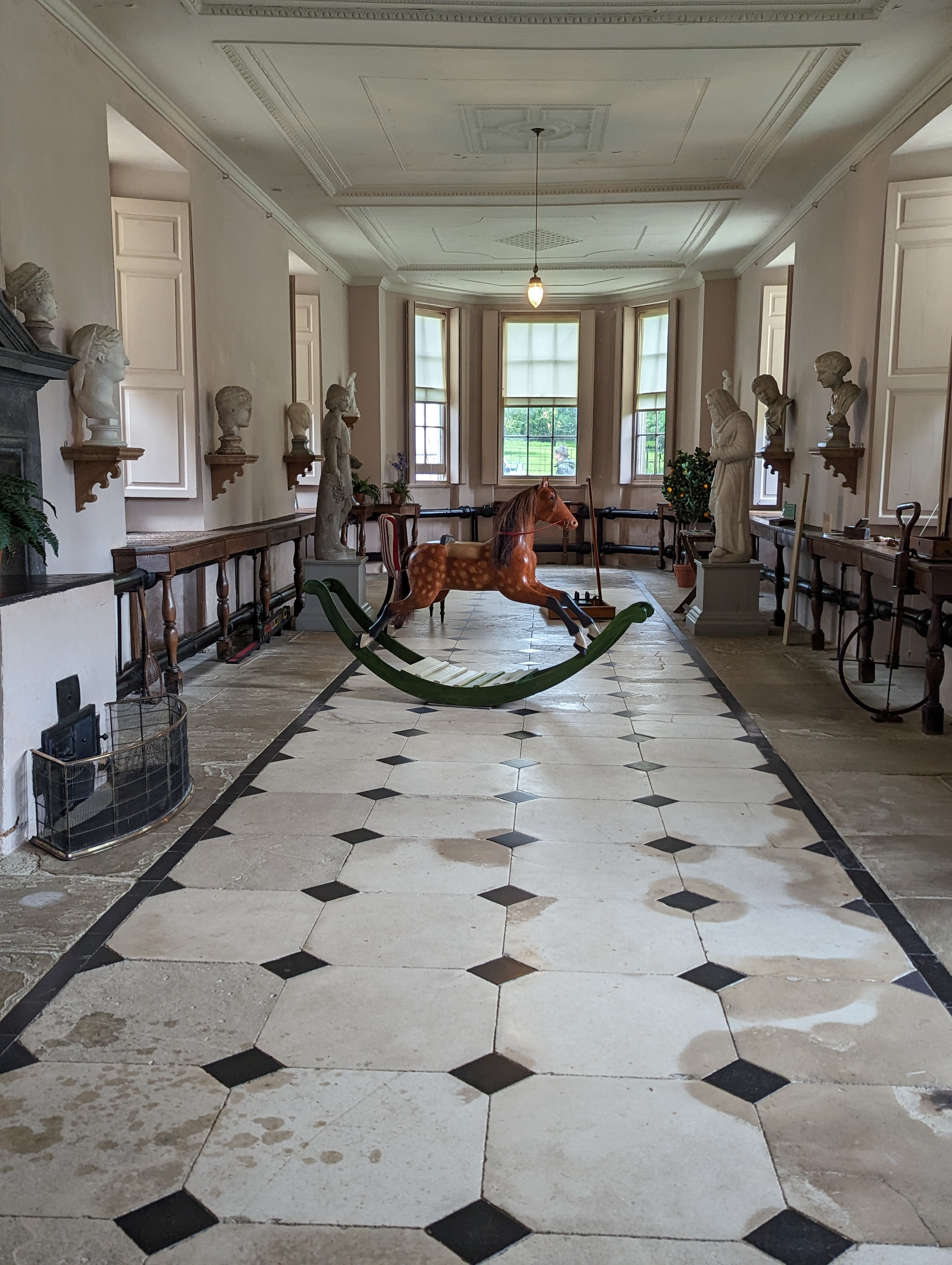
The southern end of the Stone Gallery

Precise details of William Sandys new house at The Vyne are vague. Recent archaeological research at the site has indicated a vast mansion spreading northwest from the present house, built around four courtyards – this would be consistent with better documented houses also belonging to high ranking Tudor courtiers. The author Maurice Howard in his book, The Vyne, suggests that the house, may have rivalled Hampton Court, the palace of the King's favourite, Cardinal Wolsey. This view seems to be confirmed in the writings of the sixteenth century antiquarian John Leland who described the house as "one of the most princely houses in goodly building in all Hampshire."

Work began in 1500 and it can be reliably assumed that by 1510 The Vyne was a sizeable and comfortable mansion because in that year Sandys entertained King Henry VIII during his royal progress. (Note: Henry visited again in 1535 with Anne Boleyn, the year before her execution.) An inventory drawn up in 1541 describes the house as having 57 "named rooms" – implying there were innumerable more nameless rooms. Of the rooms named and known was a long gallery, one of the earliest of such galleries to be found in an English house – the house also contained a series of small parlours and bedrooms which afforded the house's occupants a degree of privacy not common in Tudor houses at the time. Much of the fine linenfold panelling which lined these rooms remains today still in situ in the oldest parts of the house.

=== 17th century ===
Ground floor plan.

First floor plan.

Immediately upon purchase, Chute embarked on a radical redesign, by sweeping away the Base Court of the former house and all its precincts to the north – the area occupied by lawns and the lake today. Leaving only one wing of the Sandys' house containing the Long Gallery, the hall and reception rooms. The Tudor asymmetrical mullioned windows were removed and replaced by classical rectangular windows in stone frames, these pierced the walls at regular intervals providing near, but not precise symmetry. At the centre of the north front, Webb created a portico, the first of its kind on a private house in England. The instant appearance was Palladian – yet this is not really the case – in no way did it resemble the Palladianism of Charles I's reign, exemplified by the Banqueting House, Whitehall and the Queen's House, Greenwich, or even the later Palladianism pioneered by Lord Burlington where the portico was an essential feature was still seventy years away.

Even if Webb had wished to create a truly Palladian house in the spirit of Inigo Jones, conversion from a Tudor house, rather than complete rebuilding rendered Palladianism impossible. The nature of the existing building confined Webb's classicising to attempting a cohesion and unity appearance rather than design. One of the greatest obstacles to any attempt at true symmetry was the blue diapering the red Tudor brickwork, this created huge lozenge patterns in the walls which could never symmetrically match the newly installed even placed windows.

Webb's portico is built of rendered brick with Corinthian capitals of Burford stone. Its design, however, has anomalies, which are not consistent with the work of such an experienced architect. It has "abrupt" side opening; these are rectangular and bricked rather than more conventionally arched and plastered while the pediment itself is made of painted wood rather than stone. The architectural commentator Nigel Nicolson advocates a view that the portico was not finished as Webb intended. Whatever the architectural merits of the portico, it is important as the first on any English house. The impression of symmetrical Palladianism was further enforced by the screening by trees of the chapel wing at the eastern end of the house; these remained in situ until the nineteenth century.

=== 18th century ===
Chaloner Chute did not live to see his rebuilding completed. A century later, his descendant, John Chute, embarked on a process of "Gothicisation." In this process he was influenced by his friend Horace Walpole, who had developed the innovative romantic Gothic style at his own country home, Strawberry Hill in Twickenham.

Many of the alterations and additions executed under Walpole's advice were replacements of old Tudor features which had been removed during the previous classical re-modelling, notably the battlements and towers. The chief alterations were to the chapel, and in the best romantic Gothic style, the creation of a tomb house adjoining it. That the tomb house was dedicated to a man buried elsewhere and that no one was to be interred in a vault beneath was seen as no impediment to the creation of a mausoleum designed to enhance the Gothic atmosphere of the chapel and house. Walpole, although the leading arbiter of good taste, was not allowed to have full control of the re-modelling and many of his suggestions for architectural reform at The Vyne went unheeded.

=== 19th century ===
During the 19th century, the house underwent minor changes and alterations. A sense of uniformity was given by the addition of bay windows to the two extending wings of the south front. This gave the unsymmetrical south front the classical cohesion it had hitherto lacked. Here, Walpole's influence is stronger than anywhere other in the mansion. At his instigation, towers were replaced by gables. In 1842, William Wiggett, who sought to preserve the historic character of the house, acquired furniture and paintings related to John Chute at the sale of the estate of Horace Walpole at Strawberry Hill. James Austen was vicar of Sherborne St John and the Austen brothers were friends of the Chute family. They hunted with John Chute and the Austen family sometimes visited the Vyne.

== Interior ==
=== Ground floor ===
==== The Chapel ====
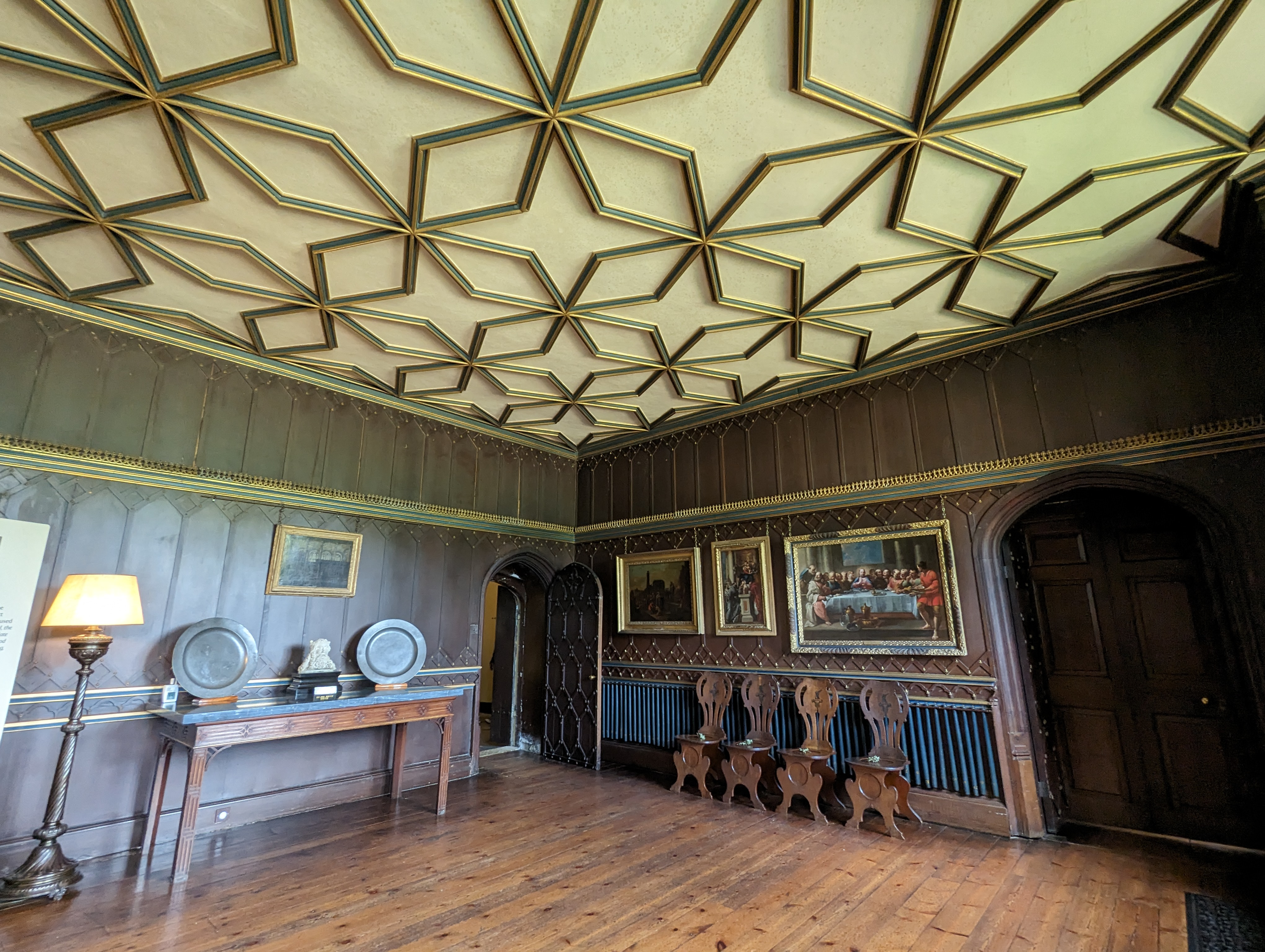
The antechapel at The Vyne

The antechapel, one of the rooms still preserved in its medieval state, contains a painting of the Last Supper by Giovanni Domenico Ferretti which was requested from Horace Mann by Walpole on Chute's behalf. It also contains fragments of stained glass from William Sandys' ruined Chapel of the Holy Ghost in Basingstoke. The Tomb Chamber, a separate room adjacent to the chapel, was the largest of John Chute's Gothic amendments to the house, and houses a monument to Chaloner Chute designed in the classical style by Thomas Carter. The chapel itself was built by William Sandys, replacing an earlier structure, and today retains the ribbed ceilings and intricately carved pews of the 16th century.

==== The Stone Gallery ====
Terracotta medallion of the Emperor Probus in the Stone Gallery.

The Stone Gallery occupies the entire space beneath the long gallery. The architectural historian, Mark Girouard, has advanced the theory that this gallery was originally an open loggia, a summer alternative to the indoor gallery above. If the Vyne's lower gallery was open, it would have been a precedent to the open gallery connecting the wings at Hatfield House which was built at the conclusion of the 16th century. What is known for sure is that it was already an enclosed gallery during the 18th century, however, its Tudor style ceiling is believed to date only from the 18th century, as does the gallery's Portland stone and marble floor.

An important feature of the Stone Gallery is the terracotta medallion of the Emperor Probus which is inset above the fireplace. Made in Italy, probably by Giovanni da Maiano, it is one of the oldest such medallions in Britain. Such medallions were to become a common external decorative feature during the short-lived English Renaissance period, similar medallions can be seen in the walls of Hampton Court Palace, while at Montacute House, the former principal entrance has several circular recesses designed for such medallions which never materialised. While it is possible this medallion may have decorated the walls of the Sandys grand mansion at The Vyne, there is no conclusive proof. It is not listed in an inventory of 1754 and there is speculation that John Chute acquired it following the demolition of the Whitehall's Holbein Gate.

=== First floor ===
The staircase is almost theatrical in its baroque chiaroscuro treatment of light, limited space and perspective.

The first floor is reached by an imperial staircase. At the centre of the house, it occupies a space once a hall in the original Tudor house. The staircase was built between 1769 and 1771. Horace Walpole had recommended its installation, however, John Chute eschewed Walpole's favoured Gothic and after a great deal of consideration of alternative styles designing himself a staircase in Palladian style. The stairs are considered one of the notable features of the house. Taking every advantage of the comparatively small space confining them a single flight rises to a galleried half landing from which four further short flights rise to a colonnaded landings and galleries. The overall effect is almost theatrical in its treatment of light, space and perspective.

The Oak Gallery has been described as one of the most famous rooms in England. it is remarkable because, as part of the Sandys mansion, it is believed to be one of the earliest long galleries in England, likely to have been built in the 1520s. Within a few years of its completion, most Tudor mansions of note were to have such a room – used for entertaining, exercising and display, their very length became a matter of competition and pride and the dimensions of the long gallery at The Vyne were soon exceeded. The early date of the gallery, and its intended use as solely for exercise, is confirmed by the fact that it leads nowhere – one enters at the northern end and has no choice but to exit by the same door. Later galleries, such as that at Montacute had rooms leading off, almost as though they were corridors, while in other houses they would connect the house with a distant wing, chapel or even a church.

The room is lined from floor to ceiling by over 400 linenfold panelling decorated with badges, crests and monograms. It seems though, that the Sandys display of their wealth in their long gallery was not as large as some of their contemporaries, an inventory of 1547, reports that the room was devoid of pictures and barely furnished.

The original mullioned windows have been replaced by classical sashes, however, the necessary cutting and alteration to the panelling during the alterations is not apparent. During the 19th century the panelling was coated with gesso and painted brown, this has been described as an "outrage". During the twentieth century, explorations into removing the paint were found to be not only too expensive, but liable to damage the panelling itself. In the mid-nineteenth century, the length of the room was slightly increased by the addition of a bay window at its southern end. At the same time the gallery was given a new floor and the rope patterned moulding on the plaster ceiling was given greater emphasis by a grained paint.

== Grounds ==
During the eighteenth century, the grounds were landscaped on the newly fashionable natural parkland style exemplified by the work of Capability Brown and later Humphrey Repton. A small stream, one of the headwaters of the Bow Brook, passing close to the house was dammed to form a lake.
