= Holy Trinity Church, Reading =

Holy Trinity Church
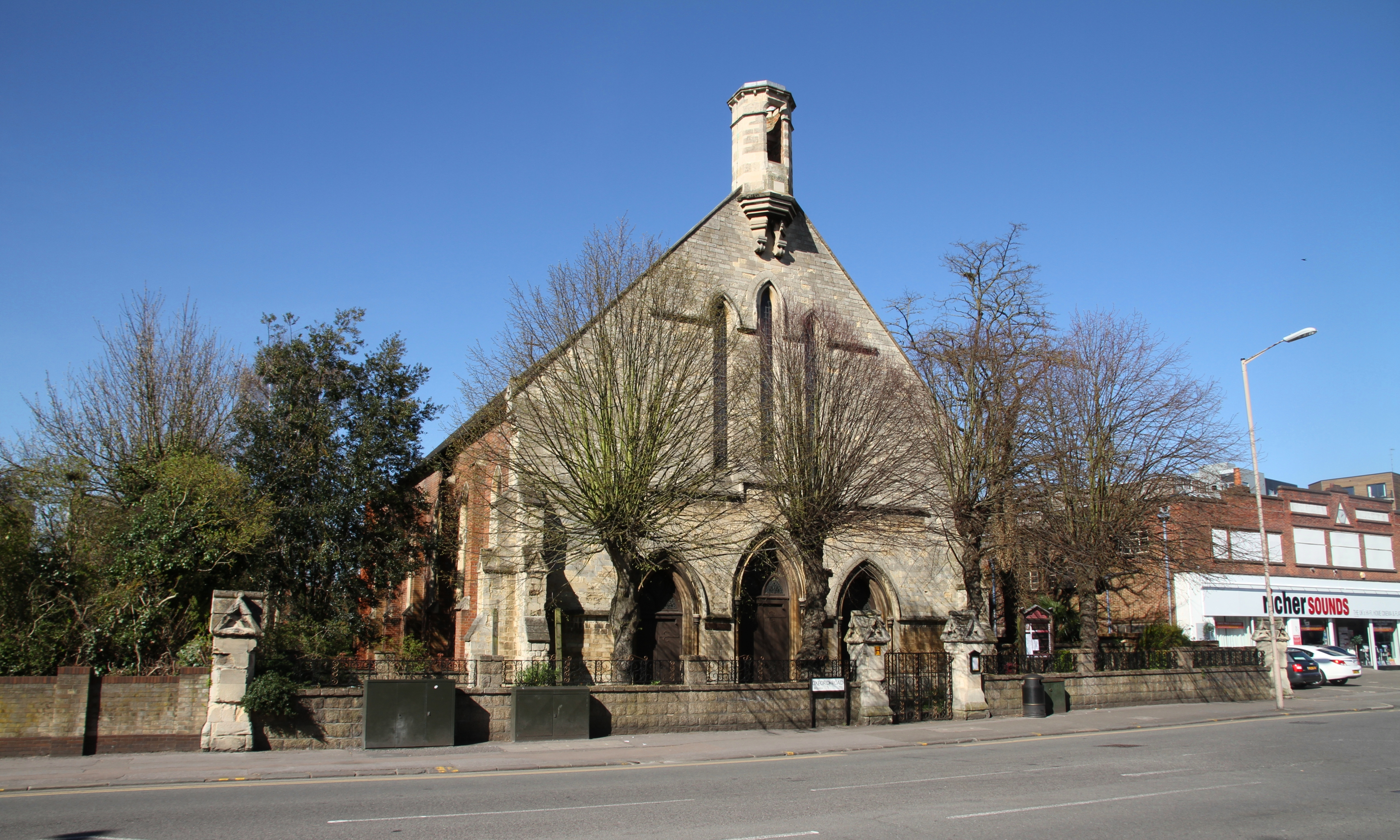
- Holy Trinity Church
- Holy Trinity Church
- 51°27′18.9″N 0°58′56.3″W
- Location: Reading
- Country: England
- Denomination: Church of England
- Churchmanship: Anglo-Catholic

History
- Dedication: Holy Trinity

Architecture
- Functional status: Active
- Heritage designation: Grade II

Administration
- Diocese: Diocese of Oxford
- Archdeaconry: Archdeaconry of Berkshire

Clergy
- Bishop: Paul Thomas (AEO)

Holy Trinity Church, also known as the Church of the Holy Trinity, is a Church of England parish church in the town of Reading in the English county of Berkshire. It is situated on the Oxford Road some 500 metres (1,600 ft) west of the town centre. It is a Grade II listed building.

== History ==
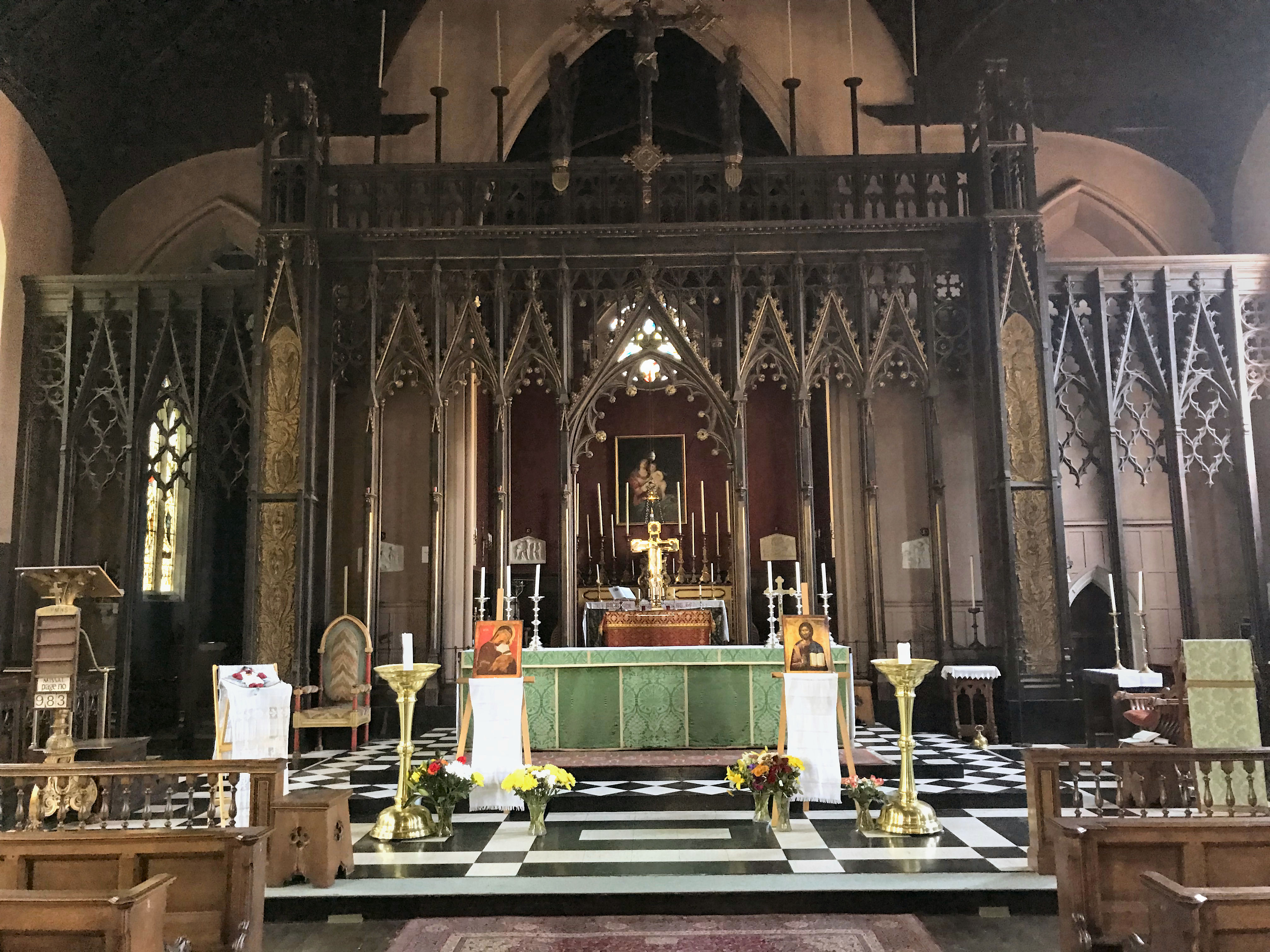
The chancel screen was designed by Augustus Pugin

The church was built in 1826 as a proprietary chapel and was designed by Edward Garbett, a local architect who was also responsible for the church of the same name in Theale. The building was heavily modified in 1845 either by another local architect, John Billing (according to the list description), or a William Webb (according to the Jesuit priest and architectural historian Anthony Symondson), when it acquired its current high-pitched roof and façade. In 1864 it became a chapel of ease in the parish of St Mary the Virgin, and in 1870 it became a parish church in its own right. The architectural historian Gavin Stamp described it as a "dull Gothic box"; but it was one which the Vicar from 1967 to 1989, Brian Brindley, greatly enlivened.

The chancel screen in the Church was designed by Augustus Pugin and had originally been installed in St Chad's Cathedral in Birmingham. It escaped destruction and was rescued and installed here by Fr Brindley. The chancel screen is the reason for the church being listed. The chancel screen was merely the most prominent of the treasures that Brindley acquired. Other items included a Martin Travers high altar (in the form of a gilded sarcophagus), designed for Nashdom Abbey, which Brindley installed in the Lady chapel. The pulpit was rescued from All Saints Church, Oxford when it was converted to Lincoln College's Library. From the same source came Sir Thomas Graham Jackson's gilded lectern. The high altar was rescued from St Paul's, Walton Street, Oxford, complete with its 17th-century tabernacle, which had itself been rescued from a Belgian church in the First World War.

The organ has a complicated history. Although the listing description refers to it as dating from 1800, this antiquity is not borne out by the details available from the National Pipe Organ Register. The original organ was installed in 1828 by Flight & Robson; it was described as 'a very bad organ'. This was replaced in 1870 by an organ made by Gray and Davison. During the Brindley era in the 1970s it was rebuilt, by an amateur, making use of organ parts from a number of other instruments, including another Gray and Davison from Brondesbury Baptist Church and an organ from All Saints, Oxford. The Brondesbury organ appears to have been rebuilt from a Hill instrument. The organ from Oxford had been built by C Martin in 1879, and restored after 1919 by PG Phipps although Symondson attributes an earlier date of 1780 to it. The entire composite organ was then restored from 1979 onwards by BC Shepherd & Sons.

The church appeared in one of the earliest ever photographs by Henry Fox Talbot whose Reading Establishment was located nearby.

As a traditionalist Anglo-Catholic church that rejects the ordination of women as priests and bishops, the parish receives alternative episcopal oversight from the Bishop of Oswestry (currently Paul Thomas).
