= Bernard Brocas (rebel) =

English knight and landowner

Sir Bernard Brocas (c. 1354 – 5 February 1400) was an English knight, landowner and administrator who was executed for his part in the Epiphany Rising.

== Life ==
Born about 1354 as the eldest son of Sir Bernard Brocas (1330–1395) of Clewer in Berkshire and his first wife Agnes Vavasour, his father was a close friend of Edward, the Black Prince. He would therefore have been acquainted as a child with the Black Prince's son, the future king Richard II. Inheriting most of his mother's estates, he became an esquire by 1385 and by 1390 was a knight in the King's service.

In 1395 he inherited his father's estates but remained living at Beaurepaire. He also inherited the hereditary office of Master of the Buckhounds. He seems to have acted as a feoffee for William Scrope, Earl of Wiltshire, one of Richard's principal ministers. He may not have been assiduous in attending court however, as surviving documents record him most often in Hampshire, where he was appointed a JP in 1396.

In 1400, after Richard II had been deposed by Henry IV, he joined in a conspiracy known as the Epiphany Rising to kill Henry and restore Richard to the throne. The plot was foiled when details were leaked and the conspirators were chased westwards from Windsor Castle by an armed force. Brocas was captured in Cirencester and sent to the Tower of London, where he was tried for treason, with three others, by Thomas FitzAlan, 12th Earl of Arundel and on 4 February condemned to death. The following day he was forced to walk to Tyburn and was there executed, presumably by beheading. He was buried in the Franciscan church of Greyfriars, London.

== Family ==
Some time before 1380 he married Joan (died 1429), who was the daughter of Sir Thomas Midelton. They lived at Beaurepaire in the parish of Sherborne St John in Hampshire and had six children, including

- the elder son William Brocas (c. 1379–1456), MP for Hampshire and High Sheriff of Hampshire
- a younger son Bernard Brocas (died c. 1431), MP for Hampshire
- the eldest daughter Catherine Brocas, who married Sir Robert Delamare of Aldermaston

Although a convicted traitor's goods and lands were forfeit to the Crown, Henry IV was not vindictive to the family. Ten days after the execution, he let the widow Joan have her husband's goods and later that year the lands yielding an annual income of 300 pounds were granted to the elder son William.

The executors of the will of Bernard Brocas, knight, were: Mathew de Gurney, John Chitterne, John Marnham, John Bridbrok, and Theobald Wykham.
