= Clewer North (ward) =

Former electoral ward in Berkshire, England

- Former electoral ward for the Windsor and Maidenhead Borough Council
- Clewer North ward boundaries from 2003 to 2019
- District: Windsor and Maidenhead
- County: Berkshire
- Electorate: 5,977 (2011)
- Major settlements: Clewer

Former electoral ward
- Created: 1974
- Abolished: 2019
- GSS code: E05002356

Clewer North was an electoral ward in the Royal Borough of Windsor and Maidenhead from 1974 to 2019. It was first used at the 1973 elections and last used for the 2015 elections. The ward returned councillors to Windsor and Maidenhead Borough Council. It covered part of Clewer, Berkshire. The ward was subject to boundary revisions in 1983 and 2003.

== 2003–2019 Windsor and Maidenhead council elections ==
There was a revision of ward boundaries in Windsor and Maidenhead in 2003.

=== 2017 by-election ===
The by-election took place on 4 May 2017.

2017 Clewer North by-election
Party	Candidate	Votes	%	±%
Independent	Wisdom da Costa	805	35.5	+1.5
Conservative	Lars Swann	784	34.6	−11.9
Liberal Democrats	Amy Tisi	405	17.9	+17.9
Labour	Michael Boyle	273	12.0	−7.5
Majority		21	0.9	
Turnout		2,267		
Independent gain from Conservative		Swing		

=== 2015 election ===
The election took place on 7 May 2015.

2015 Windsor and Maidenhead Borough Council election: Clewer North
Party	Candidate	Votes	%	±%
Conservative	John Collins	1,712		
Conservative	Nicola Pryer	1,546		
Conservative	Hashim Bhatti	1,464		
Independent	Wisdom Da Costa	1251		
Independent	Carole Da Costa	1205		
Independent	Kevin Chapman	1100		
Labour	Antony Matthews	718		
Independent	Jennifer Wilby	398		
Independent	Terry Wilby	234		
Turnout			66.77	
Conservative gain from Independent		Swing		
Conservative gain from Independent		Swing		
Conservative gain from Independent		Swing		

=== 2014 by-election ===
The by-election took place on 24 July 2014.

2014 Clewer North by-election
Party	Candidate	Votes	%	±%
Independent	Wisdom da Costa	878	57.7	+57.7
Conservative	John Collins	486	31.9	−4.6
Labour	Peter Shearman	158	10.4	−3.0
Majority		392	25.8	
Turnout		1,522		
Independent hold		Swing		

=== 2011 election ===
The election took place on 5 May 2011.

2011 Windsor and Maidenhead Borough Council election: Clewer North
Party	Candidate	Votes	%	±%
Independent	Cynthia Endacott	1,392		
Independent	John Fido	1,159		
Independent	John Penfold	1,151		
Conservative	Mark Chambers	1,016		
Conservative	Neil Perrott	895		
Conservative	David Malia	831		
Labour	Antony Matthews	372		
Turnout				
Independent hold		Swing		
Independent hold		Swing		
Independent hold		Swing		

=== 2007 election ===
The election took place on 3 May 2007.

2007 Windsor and Maidenhead Borough Council election: Clewer North
Party	Candidate	Votes	%	±%
Independent	Cynthia Endacott	1,216		
Independent	John Penfold	1,085		
Independent	John Fido	1,040		
Conservative	Peter Smith	645		
Conservative	Peter Bellini	630		
Conservative	Vivian Falzon	600		
BNP	Paul Hanson	402		
BNP	Matthew Tait	336		
Labour	Linda Ayres	233		
Labour	Marc Green	221		
Turnout		6,408	44.0	+12.4
Independent hold		Swing		
Independent hold		Swing		
Independent hold		Swing		

=== 2003 by-election ===
The by-election took place on 31 October 2003.

2003 Clewer North by-election
Party	Candidate	Votes	%	±%
Independent	John Penfold	544	42.2	+16.5
Conservative	Peter Smith	325	25.2	+13.0
Liberal Democrats	Helen Salmon	298	23.1	+15.8
Labour	Andrew Foakes	121	9.4	+2.4
Majority		219	17.0	
Turnout		1,288	22.5	
Independent hold		Swing		

=== 2003 election ===
The election took place on 1 May 2003.

2003 Windsor and Maidenhead Council election: Clewer North
Party	Candidate	Votes	%	±%
Independent	Cynthia Endacott	967		
Independent	Eileen Penfold	914		
Independent	Geoffrey Fido	883		
Conservative	Peter Smith	457		
Conservative	James Richards	452		
Conservative	Wesley Richards	430		
Liberal Democrats	John Foster	274		
Labour	Ann Matthews	265		
Labour	Andrew Foakes	250		
Liberal Democrats	Nicola Shurben	249		
Labour	Antony Matthews	245		
Liberal Democrats	Gary Wilson	227		
Turnout		5,613	31.6	
Independent win (new boundaries)				
Independent win (new boundaries)				
Independent win (new boundaries)				
