= John Webb (architect) =

English architect and scholar

- Born: 1611; Smithfield, London, England
- Died: 24 October 1672 (aged 60–61); Butleigh Court, Butleigh, Somerset, England
- Occupation: Architect
- Buildings: Wilton House

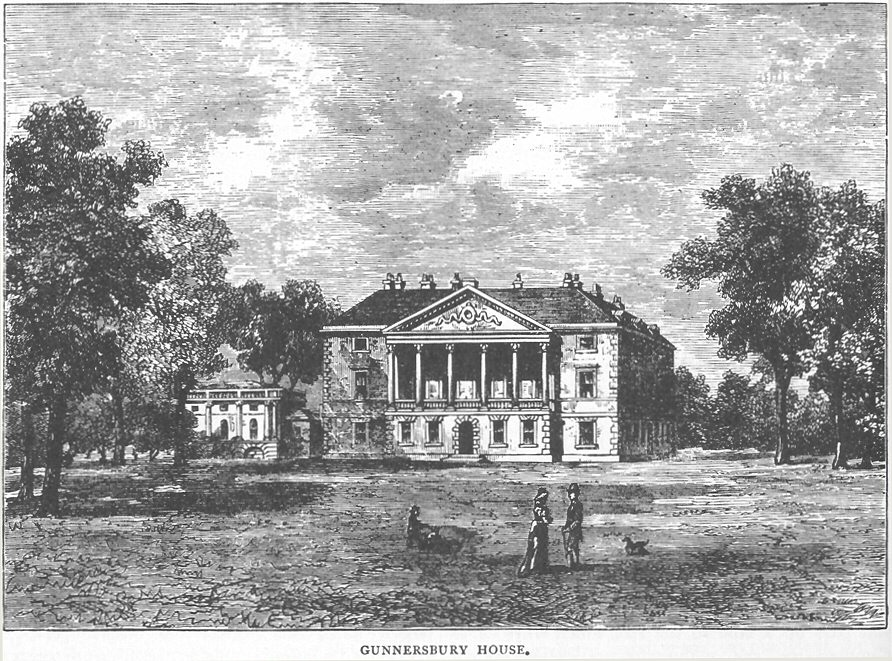
The original Gunnersbury House around 1750 (now demolished)

John Webb (1611 – 24 October 1672) was an English architect and scholar, who collaborated on some works with Inigo Jones.

== Life ==
He was born in Little Britain, Smithfield, London, and died in Butleigh in Somerset. He had a close association with fellow architect and theatre designer Inigo Jones, for whom he worked as an assistant from 1628. Webb married Anne Jones who was described as a "kinswoman" of Inigo Jones. Webb included some details of Jones's career in his two books about Stonehenge.

In the 1640s and 1650s, Jones and Webb jointly designed Wilton House (near Salisbury, Wiltshire) with its distinctive Single and Double Cube rooms.

Webb's earliest known drawings were made for the Barber Surgeons' Hall in London in 1636–7, and in 1638 he designed a lodge for John Penruddock at Hale in Hampshire and stables for a Mr Featherstone, but it is unclear if these were built.

At the beginning of the Civil War, Jones left London to attend the King at Oxford. He was later in Basing House and was captured at the end of the siege. Webb stayed in London, having been appointed Deputy Surveyor by Jones. He acted as a spy for Charles I, probably out of zeal rather than by appointment, and sent the plans of London's Lines of Communication (new fortifications) together with the number and location of the newly mounted guns.

In 1649 Webb made a number of drawings for Durham House, an unrealised project for a townhouse for the Earl of Pembroke on the Strand. In one drawing the emphasised keystones of the entrance and ground floor windows recall an early design by Jones for the Queen's House.

Upon Jones' death in 1652, Webb inherited a substantial fortune as well as a library of drawings and designs, many of which dated back to Jones' influential travels to Italy.

In 1654 Webb designed the first classical portico on an English country house, at The Vyne in Hampshire. In the Corinthian style, this portico stamps this older house as Palladian, 50 years before the birth of Lord Burlington.

In the early 1660s Charles II commissioned Webb to rebuild Greenwich Palace in a more contemporary Baroque style. His plan was for three ranges around a courtyard, open on the north side towards the Thames. The buildings were to be aligned with Inigo Jones' Queen's House, which stands a little way further south from the river, just short of the current northern boundary of Greenwich Park. The old buildings were demolished, but only one block of Webb's design was built; constructed between 1664 and 1669, it was never occupied by the royal family, and was later incorporated into Christopher Wren's designs for Greenwich Hospital, where it forms the eastern part of the King Charles Block. Webb also designed the enlargement of the Queen's House in 1662.

Further afield they also share a connection with Kingston Lacy, a stately home in Dorset where Webb supervised early works (c. 1660) on the building, following designs originally prepared by Jones.

Webb also designed the rebuild of Belvoir Castle in Leicestershire between 1654 and 1668, and made alterations to Northumberland House, a large London townhouse. He also designed Gunnersbury House in Ealing. His buildings and architectural drawings differ from those of Inigo Jones particularly in the use of rustication, a contrast in texture which is less frequently seen in Jones' work.

== Legacy ==
Webb's surviving drawings, more than 200 in number, are held by Worcester College, Oxford, the Royal Institute of British Architects (RIBA), and Chatsworth House. Webb may have been working towards a publication on the classical orders. An unbuilt design for a theatre attributed to Webb, discovered in the library of Worcester College, Oxford, was used as the basis for the Sam Wanamaker Playhouse in London, opened in 2014.

== Scholarship ==
Webb collaborated with Inigo Jones and Walter Charleton to produce a book about Stonehenge. Ten years later, he published his own Vindication of Stone-heng Restored (1665).

=== Sinology ===
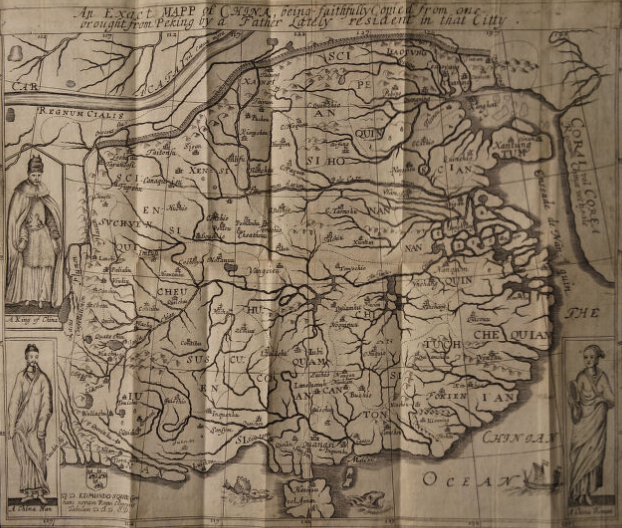
Map of China from the 1678 The Antiquity of China, a posthumous reprint

Following the restoration, there was growing interest in China and its culture. Several books were published in the 1660s in England. In 1669, Webb brought out An Historical Essay Endeavoring a Probability that the Language of the Empire of China is the Primitive Language, the first treatise on the Chinese language in any European language. Having never visited China or mastered the language, he based his essay on the travelogues of Jesuit missionaries.

=== Main works ===
- A Vindication of Stone-Heng Restored: In which the Orders and Rules of Architecture Observed by the Ancient Romans, are Discussed. Together with the Customs and Manners of Several Nations of the World in Matters of Building of Greatest Antiquity. As also an Historical Narration of the Most Memorable Actions of the Danes in England. London: Printed by R[alph] Davenport for Tho[mas] Bassett, and are to be sold at his shop under S. Dunstan's Church in Fleet-street. 1665. OCLC 3587381.
- An Historical Essay Endeavoring the Probability that Language of the Empire of China is the Primitive Language. London: Nath[aniel] Brook. 1669.

== Gallery of architectural works ==
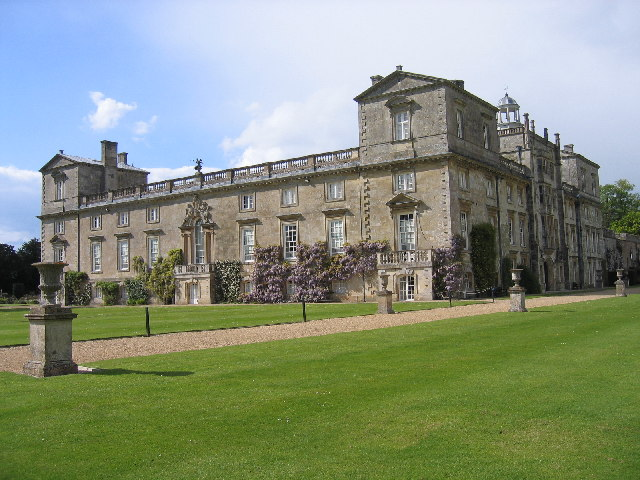
Wilton House

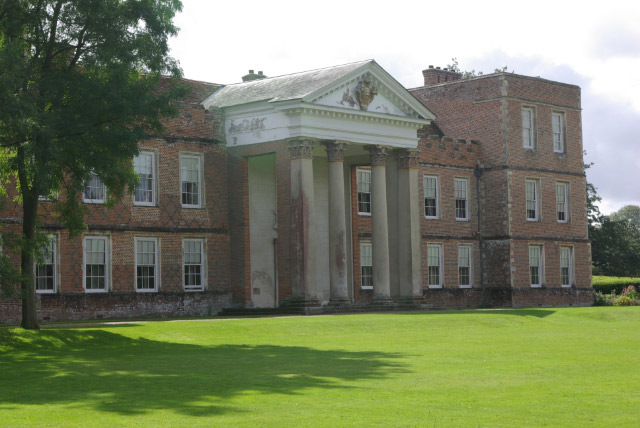
The portico, The Vyne

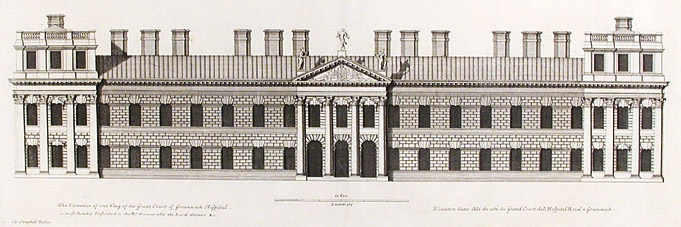
King Charles Building, Greenwich Hospital
