= Clewer Park =

Estate in Windsor, Berkshire, England

Coordinates: 51.486°N 0.630°W

Location of Clewer Park in Berkshire

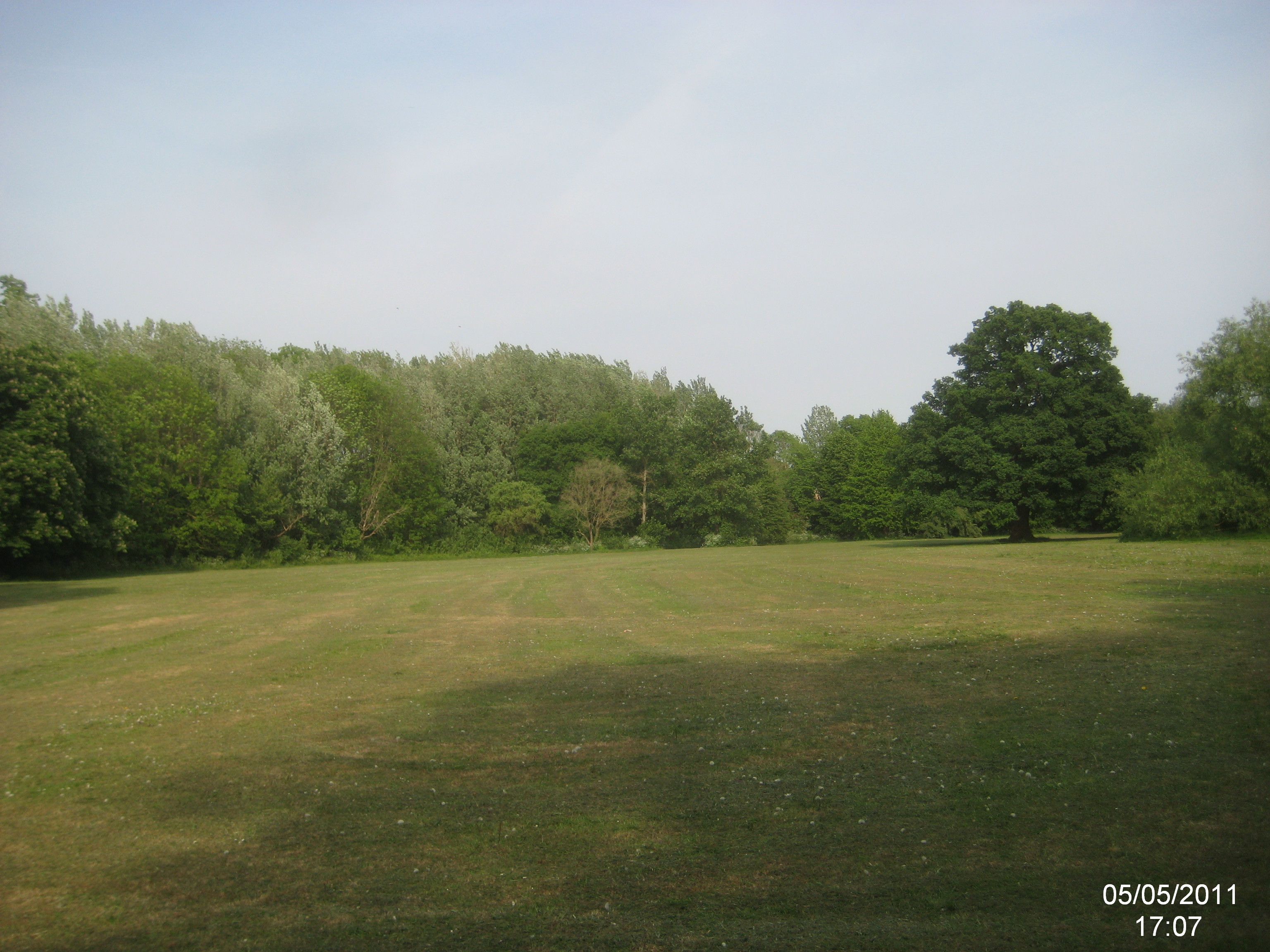
Clewer Park, 2011

Clewer Park can be found within the village of Clewer to the west of Windsor, England. Today Clewer Park consists of a small estate of residential homes built during the mid-1950s and a public open parkland.

In former times this land was occupied by the Clewer Park estate. Clewer Park was originally a medieval house. It was modified and eventually bought by Sir Daniel Gooch, the 19th century industrialist, railway engineer and engineer responsible for the first transatlantic cables. More famously, the park hosted Clewer Barracks. Built in 1796-1800 it was designed to accommodate the Royal Horse Guards. King George III's favourite regiment The Blues took up residence in what was originally carved out of Windsor Great Park. The cavalry used the area for training, manoeuvres and war preparations alongside nearby Wingfield Park. Queen Victoria subsequently authorised modernisation and upgrade of the troopers billets and officers mess after a personal visit exposed to her its unhygienic inadequacies. In 1875 she opened a brand new building named after Lord Combermere, a former colonel of the Household Cavalry.

During World War II, the house was used as accommodation for female Royal Navy staff.
