= Clewer South (ward) =

Former electoral ward in Berkshire, England

- Former electoral ward for the Windsor and Maidenhead Borough Council
- Clewer South ward boundaries from 2003 to 2019
- District: Windsor and Maidenhead
- County: Berkshire
- Electorate: 3,796 (2011)
- Major settlements: Clewer

Former electoral ward
- Created: 1974
- Abolished: 2019
- GSS code: E05002357

Clewer South was an electoral ward in the Royal Borough of Windsor and Maidenhead from 1974 to 2019. It was first used at the 1973 elections and last used for the 2015 elections. The ward returned councillors to Windsor and Maidenhead Borough Council. It covered part of Clewer, Berkshire. The ward was subject to boundary revisions in 1983 and 2003.

== 2003–2019 Windsor and Maidenhead council elections ==
There was a revision of ward boundaries in Windsor and Maidenhead in 2003.

=== 2015 election ===
The election took place on 7 May 2015.

2015 Windsor and Maidenhead Borough Council election: Clewer South
Party	Candidate	Votes	%	±%
Conservative	Michael Airey	1,250		
Conservative	Edward Wilson	861		
UKIP	Tom Bursnall	454		
Labour	Mulle Price	410		
UKIP	Donald Sanver	296		
Liberal Democrats	Richard Fagence	272		
Liberal Democrats	John Edwards	264		
Independent	Chris Beale	189		
Turnout			62.58	
Conservative hold		Swing		
Conservative hold		Swing		

=== 2011 election ===
The election took place on 5 May 2011.

2011 Windsor and Maidenhead Borough Council election: Clewer South
Party	Candidate	Votes	%	±%
Conservative	James Evans	878		
Conservative	Simon Meadowcroft	693		
Liberal Democrats	Richard Fagence	373		
Liberal Democrats	Med Boxwell	332		
Labour	Laura Binnie	275		
Total formal votes				
Informal votes		12		
Turnout			40.4	+0.1
Conservative hold		Swing		
Conservative hold		Swing		

=== 2007 election ===
The election took place on 3 May 2007.

2007 Windsor and Maidenhead Borough Council election: Clewer South
Party	Candidate	Votes	%	±%
Conservative	James Evans	784		
Conservative	Simon Meadowcroft	744		
Liberal Democrats	Richard Fagence	522		
Liberal Democrats	Antony Wood	506		
Labour	Eddie Bell	127		
Labour	Kenneth Coles	122		
Total formal votes				
Informal votes		7		
Turnout		1,470	40.3	+12.7
Conservative gain from Liberal Democrats		Swing		
Conservative gain from Liberal Democrats		Swing		

=== 2003 election ===
The election took place on 1 May 2003.

2003 Windsor and Maidenhead Council election: Clewer South
Party	Candidate	Votes	%	±%
Liberal Democrats	Richard Fagence	742		
Liberal Democrats	Antony Wood	706		
Conservative	Jennifer Heaven	232		
Conservative	Victor Chukwuemeka	207		
Labour	Linda Ayres	89		
Labour	Kenneth Coles	87		
Total formal votes				
Informal votes		1		
Turnout		1,052	27.6	
Liberal Democrats win (new boundaries)				
Liberal Democrats win (new boundaries)				
