= Brian Brindley =

Former Anglican priest, Catholic layman

- Canon
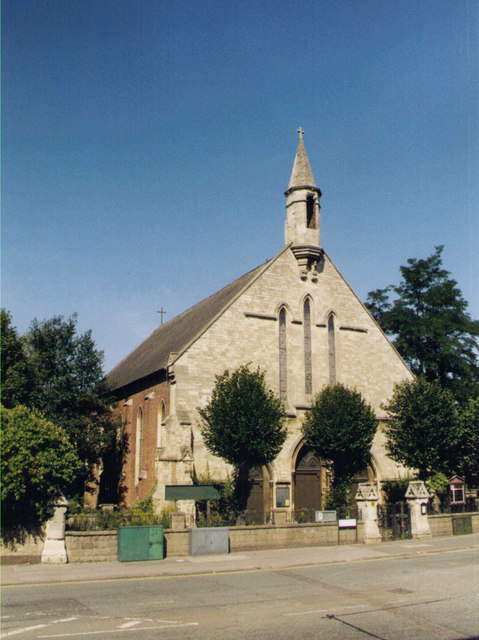
- Holy Trinity, Reading
- Appointed: 1967
- Term ended: 1989
- Previous posts: Curate, St Andrew's, Clewer (1962-67), Honorary Canon, Christ Church, Oxford (1985-89)

Orders
- Ordination: 1962 (deacon), 1963 (priest)

Personal details
- Born: Brian Frederick Brindley; 3 August 1931 Harrow, Middlesex, England
- Died: 1 August 2001 (aged 69) Athenaeum Club, London
- Denomination: Roman Catholic Church, prev. Church of England
- Education: Stowe School, Exeter College, Oxford, Ely Theological College

The Rev. Brian Dominic Frederick Titus Brindley (3 August 1931 – 1 August 2001) was a prominent Anglican priest who later became a Roman Catholic layman. He was Vicar of Holy Trinity in Reading until a scandal about homosexuality forced his resignation. He later converted to Roman Catholicism over the Anglican ordination of women, and wrote for church newspapers.

== Early life ==
Born in Harrow, London in 1931, as Brian Frederick Brindley, he was educated at Stowe School, after which he completed his National Service in Germany. He then entered Exeter College, Oxford, where he read Modern History, and was a contemporary of Ned Sherrin and Alan Bennett. During his time in Oxford, he wrote a 17th-century style masque, Porci ante Margeritam ("Swine before a Pearl"), which was performed for Princess Margaret. At Oxford he took the additional names Dominic and Titus. He took a Third and then read Jurisprudence for another two years, but had a breakdown and went down in 1956 without taking a further degree. He then read law at Gibson and Weldon, a crammer, but did not proceed to the Bar.

== Career ==
He decided to enter the priesthood, attempting first to enter St Stephen's House, Oxford, but was refused, instead entering Ely Theological College. He was ordained deacon in 1962 and priest in 1963, and served his title at St Andrew's, Clewer. (1962–67).

In 1967 he was appointed Vicar of Holy Trinity in Reading, which he transformed into an ornate centre of Anglo-Catholic worship. He was likewise known for his eccentric and flamboyant personal style, as one obituary described: "He wore his grey curly hair in a style resembling a periwig and dressed in lavish Roman monsignoral attire, including buckled shoes with four-inch heels, which he had painted red." The architectural historian Gavin Stamp described Holy Trinity as a "dull Gothic box"; but it was one which Brindley greatly enlivened.

The chancel screen in the church was designed by Augustus Pugin and had originally been installed in St Chad's Cathedral in Birmingham. It escaped destruction and Brindley rescued and installed it. The chancel screen is the reason for the church being listed. The chancel screen was merely the most prominent of the treasures that Brindley acquired. Other items included a Martin Travers high altar (in the form of a gilded sarcophagus), designed for Nashdom Abbey, which Brindley installed in the Lady chapel. The pulpit was rescued from All Saints Church, Oxford when it was converted to Lincoln College's Library. From the same source came Sir Thomas Graham Jackson's gilded lectern. The high altar was rescued from St Paul's, Walton Street, Oxford, complete with its 17th-century tabernacle, which had itself been rescued from a Belgian church in the First World War.

The Church's General Synod was established in 1970. Brindley unsuccessfully sought election on that occasion, but successfully so at the following election in 1975, and remained a vocal and prominent Anglo-Catholic member of Synod until his fall from grace. In 1985 he was made an honorary canon of Christ Church Cathedral, Oxford.

In the summer of 1989, the News of the World published a front-page article which incorporated a secretly recorded conversation in which Brindley fantasized about young men. After two evangelical members of Synod circulated photocopies of the tabloid's front page to all 500 members, Brindley resigned from Synod, the canonry, and his parish. Eric Kemp, Bishop of Chichester, offered him the position of Diocesan Pastoral Secretary in the Diocese of Chichester.

== Conversion ==
Brindley retired to Western Terrace in Brighton in 1993, and following the General Synod's decision in 1992 to ordain female priests, converted to Roman Catholicism in 1994. He remarked of it: "I felt as if I had been a commercial traveller who had been selling vacuum cleaners for 30 years, only to discover suddenly that they didn't work". He began a second career writing for the literary page of the Catholic Herald and the cookery column of the Church Times. He also wrote book reviews for the Church Times: his last review (of Roger Bellamy's Spirit in Stone) was published after his death.

== Death and legacy ==
For many months Brindley had been planning a celebration for his 70th birthday at the Athenaeum, of which he was a member. (After his fall from grace, the former Archbishop of Canterbury, Lord Coggan, an evangelical, had unsuccessfully attempted to have him expelled.) The dinner was to take place two days before his birthday. There were to be seven courses: Brindley had a heart attack between the dressed crab and the boeuf en daube. His death led to an outpouring of interest, far in excess of his celebrity.

The funeral was a sung Latin requiem at St Etheldreda's Church. He was buried at North Weald Cemetery in Stanmore.

A number of his friends collaborated in the production of an appreciation of his life, edited by Damian Thompson: Loose Canon: A Portrait of Brian Brindley (Continuum, 2004) ISBN 9780826474186.
