= Edward Garbett =

Edward Garbett (1817–1887), was a religious figure and writer of the 19th century.

Garbett was born in Hereford on 10 December 1817, the sixth son of the Reverend James Garbett (1775–1857), custos rotulorum and prebendary of Hereford Cathedral. He was educated at Hereford Cathedral School, and then Brasenose College, Oxford. He obtained a B.A. in 1841 and M.A. in 1847.

== Early career ==
He had originally wished to become a doctor, but later showed preference for work in the religious ministry. Garbett was ordained deacon by the Bishop of Hereford in 1841 and started work as curate in the village of Upton Bishop, where his father was vicar. The following year, he moved to Birmingham as curate of St. George's, under his cousin, the Rev. John Garbett. At Birmingham he obtained his first preferment, the vicarage of St. Stephen's. In 1854 he became perpetual curate of St. Bartholomew's, Gray's Inn Road in London. In 1860 he accepted the Boyle Lectureship on the nomination of Bishop Tait, and in 1861 was appointed a select preacher at Oxford. In 1863 he moved to Christ Church, Surbiton, and in 1867 was appointed Bampton Lecturer at Oxford.

Garbett became editor of The Christian Advocate and Review.

== Later years ==
In 1875, he was appointed an honorary canon of Winchester. In 1877 he accepted from the Lord Chancellor the living of Barcombe, Lewes. He had previously declined invitations to succeed Dr. Miller at St. Martin's, Birmingham, and to fill the fashionable pulpit of St Paul's, Onslow Square, London. During the earlier gatherings of the Church Congress, Garbett's aid was often asked. He read a paper at York in 1866, and again at the meetings of 1869, 1870, 1871, 1872, 1873, 1874, and 1879. Garbett's health deteriorated during his time at Barcombe, and he became paralysed on 11 October 1886. He died on 11 October 1887.

== Works ==
- The Soul's Life, 1852.
- Sermons for Children, 1854.
- The Bible and its Critics (Boyle Lectures), 1860. Reprinted by Kessinger (2010) ISBN 1-1670-1518-5
- The Divine Plan of Revelation (Boyle Lectures), 1863. Reprinted by BiblioBazaar (2010) ISBN 1-1405-4566-3
- The Family of God, 1863. Reprinted by BiblioBazaar (2008) ISBN 0-554-80962-1
- God's Word Written, 1864. Reprinted by BiblioBazaar (2009) ISBN 1-1175-8114-4
- Religion in Daily Life, 1865.
- Dogmatic Faith (Bampton Lectures), 1867. Reprinted by Kessinger (2010) ISBN 1-1629-7013-8
- Obligations of Truth, 1874. Reprinted by Kessinger (2010) ISBN 1-1636-0322-8
- The Family Prayer Book
- The Pentateuch and its authority : a review of "The Pentateuch and book of Joshua critically examined by John William Colenso
- Experiences of the Inner Life
