= Sherborne St John =

Village and parish in Hampshire, England

Coordinates: 51.2944°N 1.1098°W

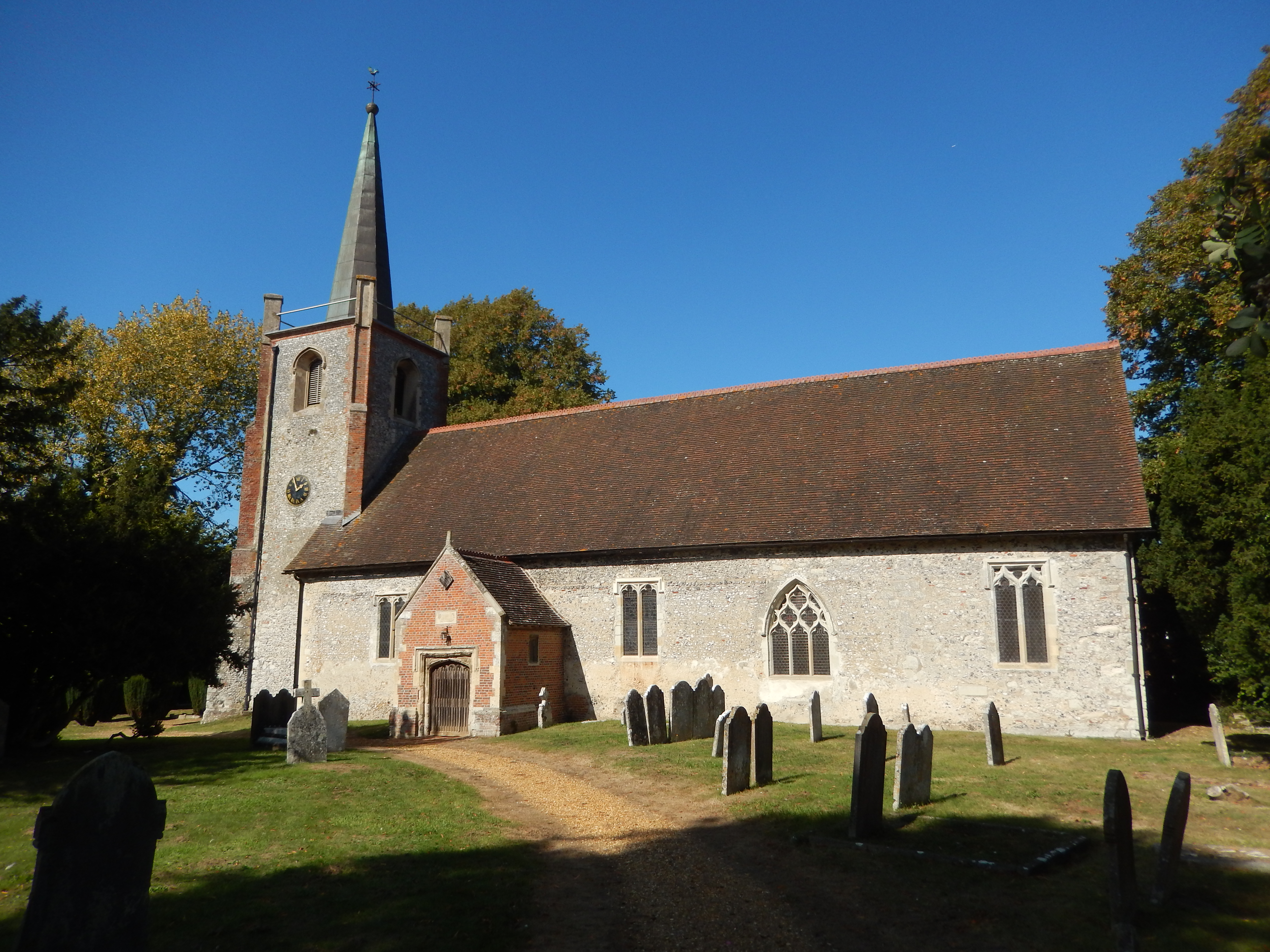
- St Andrew's Church, Sherborne St. John

- Location within Hampshire
- Population: 2,584 (Civil Parish, 2001); 3,265 (2011 Census)
- OS grid reference: SU621554
- Civil parish: Sherborne St John
- District: Basingstoke and Deane
- Shire county: Hampshire
- Region: South East
- Country: England
- Sovereign state: United Kingdom
- Post town: BASINGSTOKE
- Postcode district: RG24
- Dialling code: 01256
- Police: Hampshire and Isle of Wight
- Fire: Hampshire and Isle of Wight
- Ambulance: South Central
- UK Parliament: North West Hampshire
- Website: Sherborne St John

Sherborne St John is a village and civil parish near Basingstoke in the English county of Hampshire.

== History ==
The village was named in the Domesday Book as Sireburne. It became Shireburna (12th century), Schyreburne (13th century) and Shirebourne Decani, Shireburn St. John in the 14th century.

Sir Bernard Brocas, the 14th century soldier and friend of the Black Prince, held the Beaurepaire estate in Sherborne St John. His son, the rebel, also called Sir Bernard Brocas, made it the family's permanent home.

== Governance ==
The village of Sherborne St John is a civil parish with a parish council and ward of Basingstoke and Deane borough council. The borough council is a Non-metropolitan district of Hampshire County Council and all three councils are responsible for different aspects of local government.

== Culture and community ==
The following can be found in the village: The Swan pub, Sherborne St John Social Club (established 1903 and oldest registered club in the country), Sherborne St. John Village Hall (and clock), Sherborne St. John Tennis Club, St. Andrews Church, Sherborne St John FC, 1 duck pond, 2 swing parks, Chute Pavilion and Sports Field, Sherborne St. John Toddlers, and a village green.

Sherborne St. John has its own parish magazine, The Villager. A Greening Campaign has been launched to make all the locals eco friendly.

Annual events in the parish include the Sherborne St John Village Fayre and Monk Sherborne & District Horticultural Show.

== Landmarks ==
Sherborne is the location of two well-known country estates:

- The Vyne is a 16th-century country house, built by William, Lord Sandys, later the home of the Chute family and now owned by the National Trust.
- Beaurepaire, formerly a Tudor mansion, was almost entirely rebuilt after a fire in Victorian times. It was the home of the Brocas family for many centuries from the time of Sir Bernard Brocas, the hero of Crécy.

== Education ==
The Sherborne St. John Church of England Primary School is over 150 years old and teaches year R (Reception) and years 1–6. The school has approximately 17 children in each year, and approximately 115 students in total. In the SATS results of 2010 the school placed as the top primary school in Hampshire (based on Average Points Score).

Children aged 11 to 16 that receive state-funded education are likely to attend The Hurst School in Baughurst.

== See also ==
- List of places in Hampshire
- List of civil parishes in Hampshire
