= Bernard Brocas (soldier and MP) =

English politician (1330–1395)

Sir Bernard Brocas, also Barnard Brocas Senior (1330–1395) was a prominent commander in the English army during King Edward III's French campaigns of the Hundred Years War. He was also a close friend of the Black Prince and William of Wykeham.

Brocas was the son of Sir John Brocas of Clewer in Berkshire, a Master of the King's Horse. He grew up with the Black Prince at Windsor Castle, at a time of rebuilding by the Royal architect William of Wykeham. After a scandalous first marriage, to Agnes, daughter of Mauger Vavasour of Yorkshire, which ended in divorce, the Prince intended Brocas to marry his cousin, Joan, the Fair Maid of Kent but when Joan said she loved Edward, he decided to marry her himself. As compensation, he found Brocas another great heiress, Mary des Roches, a kinswoman of Peter des Roches, Bishop of Winchester.

Brocas fought with Edward at the Battles of Poitiers, Crécy and Nájera. After the Peace of Bretigny, he helped to settle Aquitaine and was appointed Constable there. It has been claimed that he captured and chopped off the head of a King of Morocco, but the story seems to be apocryphal.

In England, Brocas acted as Queen's Chamberlain to Anne of Bohemia. He had residences at Clewer Brocas Manor in Berkshire, and at Beaurepaire in Sherborne St John and Roche Court near Fareham, both in Hampshire. He was a great patron of Southwick Priory. He served as High Sheriff of Wiltshire for 1382 and married Katharine, widow of Hugh Tyrell. Brocas was MP for Wiltshire in 1391 and then MP eight times for Hampshire.

He married three times and had at least five children, amongst them, Sir Bernard Brocas the Younger, who was executed for treason in 1400.

Brocas died on 20 September 1395 and was buried in St Edmund's Chapel in Westminster Abbey, where his fine effigial monument can still be seen today.

The name Brocas lives on in the name Viscount Brocas, one of the subsidiary titles of the Earl Jellicoe; and in the name of an area of open land on the north bank of the river Thames at Eton, formerly owned by the Brocas family.
