= Beaurepaire, Hampshire =

Coordinates: 51.3191°N 1.0900°W

Beaurepaire is a country estate at Sherborne St John in the English county of Hampshire.

== History ==
Beaurepaire was owned by the Brocas family from Aquitaine for approximately 500 years.

In the 14th century, Sir John Brocas was Edward III's Master of the Horse. In 1369, Edward permitted John's son, Bernard, to enclose the parkland and create the Beaurepaire estate. As a knight, Bernard was favoured by Edward, the Black Prince, and accompanied him during the Battle of Poitiers in 1356. Bernard later became Chief Surveyor and Sovereign Warden of the parks at Winchester College; he was acquainted with the college's founder, William of Wykeham.

The house suffered considerable damage during the Civil War and was later rebuilt in 1777. The house is moated with access over small bridges: the white iron gates to the main bridge were designed by Sir John Soane.

== Recent history ==
The estate was sold by the Brocas family in 1873. In 1941, the building was largely destroyed by fire. The Tudor servants’ wing, however, survived. The owner at the time of the fire, Sir Strati Ralli, was unable to restore or repair the house due to wartime restriction of building materials.

In 1959, the house was bought by Roger Makins, 1st Baron Sherfield who lived in nearby Sherfield. Makins commissioned Tom Bird (an architect who worked at the offices of Maxwell Fry) to restore the building. The building was further renovated by Makins's son, Dwight, who added a cloister garden with battlements and crow-stepped gables. The house is now a Grade II listed building.

In the early 21st century, the estate was put up for sale. The estate was broken into lots, aiming to attract offers of £3.4 million for the house and immediate grounds, or offers exceeding £7 million for the full estate of 753 acres (305 ha).

The house had been bought by Elena Baturina, the wife of Yuri Luzhkov, the former mayor of Moscow, for £5.5m through a shell company called Skymist Holdings Limited, which was also responsible for the extensive renovation.
